This is a list of notable women writers.

Abbreviations: b. (born), c. (circa), ch. (children's), col. (columnist), es. (essayist), fl. (flourished), Hc. (Holocaust), mem. (memoirist), non-f. (non-fiction), nv. (novelist),  pw. (playwright),  wr. (writer), TV (television), YA (young adult)

See also women writers by nationality

A

Aa–Ag
Karen Aabye (1904–1982, Denmark), nv. & travel wr.
Uma Aaltonen (1940–2009, Finland), YA wr.
Jane Aamund (1936–2019, Denmark), col. & nv.
Jane Aaron (b. 1951, Wales), wr. & scholar
Madiha Abdalla (fl 2010s), Sudanese newspaper editor
Masoumeh Abad (b. 1962, Iran/Persia), mem. & academic
Mercedes Abad (b. 1961, Spain), fiction wr.
Ines Abassi (b. 1982, Tunisia/UAE), poet & travel wr.
Florencia Abbate (b. 1976, Argentina), fiction wr., poet & es.
Eleanor Hallowell Abbott (1872–1958, United States), poet & fiction wr.
Rachel Abbott (b. 1952, England), thriller wr.
Shaila Abdullah (b. 1971, Pakistan/United States), fiction & ch. wr.
Yassmin Abdel-Magied (b. 1991, Sudan/Australia), wr. & media person
Hafsat Abdulwaheed (b. 1952, Nigeria), poet & fiction & non-f. wr.
Rreze Abdullahu (b. 1990, Kosovo), wr. & war diarist
Louise Abeita (1926–2014, United States), wr.
Victorina A. Abellanosa (1903–1968, Philippines), Cebuano pw.
Josette Abondio (b. 1949, Ivory Coast), nv. & ch. wr.
Sara Aboobacker (1936–2023, India), Kannada wr.
Marguerite Abouet (b. 1971, Ivory Coast), comics wr.
Leila Aboulela (b. 1964, Sudan), wr.
Leila Abouzeid (b. 1950, Morocco), social wr.
Abiola Abrams (b. 1976, United States), wr. & filmmaker
Liliana Abud (b. 1948, Mexico), TV screenwriter
Umayya Abu-Hanna (b. 1961, Palestine/Finland), fiction & non-f. wr.
Susan Abulhawa (b. 1970, Palestine/United States), nv.
Lama Abu-Odeh (b. 1962, Palestine/United States), wr. on Islamic law
Juliet Ace (b. 1938, Wales), pw. & scriptwriter
Nora Aceval (b. 1953, Algeria/France), story teller
Anna Maria Achenrainer (1909–1972, Austria/Austria-Hungary), wr.
Catherine Obianuju Acholonu (1951–2014, Nigeria), poet & social wr.
Kathy Acker (1947–1997, United States), nv., poet & pw.
Maximiliane Ackers (1896–1982, Germany), fiction wr.
Bertilda Samper Acosta (1856–1910, Comoros), poet & nun
Ofelia Uribe de Acosta (1900–1988, Comoros), suffragist
Soledad Acosta (1833–1913, Comoros), sociologist
Eliza Acton (1799–1859, England), cookery wr. & poet; Modern Cookery for Private Families
Joyce Ackroyd (1918–1991, Australia), wr. & academic
Avis Acres (1910–1994, New Zealand), ch. wr. & illustrator
Angelina Acuña (1905–2006, Guatemala), sonneteer
Dora Acuña (1903–1987, Paraguay), poet & col.
Rosario de Acuña (1850–1923, Spain), poet, pw. & es.
Alma Flor Ada (b. 1938, Cuba), ch. wr., poet & nv.
Barbara Adair (living, South Africa), nv. in English
Varsha Adalja (b. 1940, India), nv. & pw.
Juliette Adam (1836–1936, France), wr. & editor
Pip Adam (living, New Zealand), fiction wr.
Gabriela Adameșteanu (b. 1942, Romania), fiction wr. & es.
Draginja Adamović (1925–2000, Serbia), poet
Abigail Adams (1744–1818, United States), First Lady of the United States, letter wr. & diarist
Glenda Adams (1939–2007, Australia), fiction wr.
Lois Bryan Adams (1817–1870, United States), wr., journalist & ed.
Mary Mathews Adams (1840–1902, Ireland/United States), wr.
Patricia J. Adams (b. 1952, Anguilla), poet, wr. & broadcaster
Sarah Fuller Flower Adams (1805–1848, England), poet & lyricist
Patsy Adam-Smith (1924–2001, Australia), historian
Catherine Adamson (1868–1925, Australia/New Zealand), homemaker & diarist
Gil Adamson (b. 1961, Canada/Newfoundland), fiction wr. & poet
Alison Adburgham (1912–1997, England), non-f. wr. & social historian
Fleur Adcock (b. 1934, New Zealand/England), poet & editor
Caroline Adderson (b. 1963, Canada/Newfoundland), fiction wr.
Yda Addis (1857–1902, United States), wr. & translator
Lucia H. Faxon Additon (1847–1919, United States), wr. 
Kim Addonizio (b. 1954, United States), poet & nv.
Ayọ̀bámi Adébáyọ̀ (b. 1988, Nigeria), nv.
Bisi Adeleye-Fayemi (b. 1963, Nigeria), wr. & policy advocate
Sade Adeniran (b. 1960s, Nigeria), nv.
Anne-Marie Adiaffi (1951–1994, Ivory Coast), nv.
Chimamanda Ngozi Adichie (b. 1977, Nigeria), fiction & non-f. wr.
Akachi Adimora-Ezeigbo (living, Nigeria), wr. & educator
Opal Palmer Adisa (b. 1954, Jamaica), poet, nv. & educator
Halide Edib Adıvar (1884–1964, Turkey/Ottoman Empire), nv. & rights activist
Zoe Adjonyoh (b. late 1970s, England), wr. & cook
Carine Adler (b. 1948, Brazil), screenwriter
Emma Adler (1858–1935, Austria/Austria-Hungary), nv. & non-f. wr.
Renata Adler (b. 1938, United States), wr., col. & critic
Sophie Adlersparre (1823–1895, Sweden), feminist editor & wr.
Etel Adnan (1925–2021, Lebanon/United States), poet, es. & artist
Wilna Adriaanse (b. 1958, South Africa), nv. in Afrikaans
Aesara of Lucania (4th or 3rd century BC, Ancient Greece), philosopher
Ethel Afamado (b. 1940, Uruguay), poet & songwriter
Gladys Afamado (b. 1925, Uruguay), poet & artist
Anastasia Afanasieva (b. 1982, Ukraine), physician, poet, writer & translator
Janet Afary (living, Iran/Persia/United States), historian & religious wr.
Mahnaz Afkhami (b. 1941, Iran/Persia/United States), wr. & rights activist
Ishrat Afreen (b. 1956, Pakistan), poet
Vittoria Aganoor (1855–1910, Italy), poet
Smita Agarwal (b. 1958, India), poet & academic
Patience Agbabi (b. 1965, England), poet
Berthe-Evelyne Agbo (living, Benin/France), poet
Charlotte Agell (b. 1959, Sweden/United States), nv. & ch. wr.
Adalet Ağaoğlu (1929–2020, Turkey/Ottoman Empire), nv., pw. & essayist
Süreyya Ağaoğlu (1903–1989, Azerbaijan/Turkey/Ottoman Empire), legal wr.
Pinky Agnew (b. 1955, New Zealand), pw.
Kelli Russell Agodon (b. 1969, United States), poet, wr. & editor
Marjorie Agosín (b. 1955, Chile), rights activist
Gerty Agoston (living, Hu/United States), pw. & nv.
Marie d'Agoult (1805–1876, France), fiction wr. & historian
Agripina Samper Agudelo (1833–1892, Comoros), poet
Brígida Agüero (1837–1866, Cuba), poet
Josefa Toledo de Aguerri (1866–1962, Nicaragua), social wr.
Grace Aguilar (1816–1847, England), nv. & wr.
Mila D. Aguilar (b. 1949, Philippines), poet & es.
Anna Aguilar-Amat (b. 1962, Spain), poet & es. in Catalan
Francisca Aguirre (1930–2019, Spain), poet
Mirta Aguirre (1912–1980, Cuba), poet & nv.
Milena Agus (b. 1959, Italy), nv.
Ucu Agustin (b. 1976, Indonesia), wr. & filmmaker
Delmira Agustini (1886–1914, Uruguay), poet

Ah–An
Freda Ahenakew (1932–2011, Canada/Newfoundland), wr. & academic
Cecelia Ahern (b. 1981, Ireland), nv.
Catharina Ahlgren (1734 – c. 1800, Sweden), feminist wr., poet & editor
Rukhsana Ahmad (b. 1948, Pakistan/England), wr. & translator
Pegah Ahmadi (b. 1974, Iran/Persia), poet, scholar & critic
Mimoza Ahmeti (b. 1963, Albania), poet & wr.
Merete Ahnfeldt-Mollerup (b. 1963, Denmark), wr. & academic
Astrid Ahnfelt (1876–1962, Sweden), fiction wr.
Zeynep Ahunbay (b. 1946, Turkey/Ottoman Empire), conservation wr.
Ilse Aichinger (1921–2016, Austria/Austria-Hungary), wr.
Renate Aichinger (b. 1976, Austria/Austria-Hungary), pw. & director
Ama Ata Aidoo (b. 1942, Ghana/Gold Coast), wr. & pw.
Naja Marie Aidt (b. 1963, Denmark), poet & wr.cat
Victoria Aihar (b. 1978, Uruguay), nv.
Ginny Aiken (b. 1955, Cuba/United States), fiction wr.
Joan Aiken (1924–2004, England), nv.
Aganice Ainianos (1838–1892, Greece), poet
Sarona Aiono-Iosefa (b. 1962, New Zealand), ch. wr.
Ashia (died 1009/1010, Spain), poet in Arabic
Amanda Aizpuriete (b. 1956, Latvia), poet & translator
Tobiloba Ajayi (living, Nigeria), wr. & campaigner
Iris Akahoshi (1929–1987, United States), wr. for Amnesty International
Miriam Akavia (1927–2015, Poland/Israel), mem. & Hc. survivor
Akiko Akazome (赤染晶子, 1974–2017, Japan), fiction wr.
Akazome Emon (赤染衛門, late 950s/early 960s – post-1041), poet & historian
Miriam Akavia (1927–2015, Poland/Israel), wr. & translator
Grace Akello (b. 1950, Uganda), poet, es. & folklorist
Anna Åkerhjelm (1647–1693, Sweden), wr. & traveler
Rachel Akerman (1522–1544, Austria/Austria-Hungary), poet
Sonja Åkesson (1926–1977, Sweden), poet, wr. & artist
Bella Akhmadulina (1937–2010, Soviet Union/Russia), poet
Anna Akhmatova (1889–1966, Russia/Soviet Union), poet; Requiem
Shaheen Akhtar (b. 1962, Bangladesh), fiction wr.
Sakina Akhundzadeh (1865–1927, Azerbaijan), pw. & teacher
Gülten Akın (1933–2015, Turkey/Ottoman Empire), poet
Risu Akizuki (秋月りす, b. 1957, Japan), manga creator
Layla al-Akhyaliyya (7th century, Ancient Arabia), poet
Elena Akselrod (b. 1932, Soviet Union/Israel), poet
Seza Kutlar Aksoy (b. 1945, Turkey/Ottoman Empire), ch. wr.
Ogdo Aksyonova (1936–1995, Soviet Union/Russia), poet in Dolgan
Magaly Alabau (b. 1945, Cuba/United States), poet & theater director
Susanna Alakoski (b. 1962, Finland), nv. & lecturer in Swedish
Zuleika Alambert (1922–2012, Brazil), feminist wr.
Mathilde Alanic (1864–1948, France), nv. & ss.
Outi Alanne (b. 1967, Finland), autobiographer
Abimbola Alao (living, Nigeria), poet, fiction wr. & storyteller
Alev Alatlı (b. 1944, Turkey/Ottoman Empire), economist & nv.
Ave Alavainu (1942–2022, Estonia), poet
Suzanne Alaywan (b. 1974, Lebanon), poet & painter
Caterina Albert (1869–1966, Spain), modernist wr.
Eva Allen Alberti (1856–1938, United States) non-f. wr. & drama.
Anne-Marie Albiach (1937–2012, France), poet
Alice Albinia (b. 1976, England), non-f. wr.
Jordie Albiston (1961–2022, Australia), poet & academic
Núria Albó (b. 1930, Spain), poet & nv.
Aurora de Albornoz (1926–1990, Spain), poet
Martha Albrand (1914–1981, Germany/United States), nv.
Vera Albreht (1895–1971, Austria/Austria-Hungary/Slovenia), poet & YA wr.
Madeleine Albright (1937–2022, Czechoslovakia/Czech Republic/United States), political wr. & mem.
Florența Albu (1934–2000, Romania), poet
Erlinda K. Alburo (living, Philippines), Cebuano scholar
Isabel Alçada (b. 1950, Portugal), ch. wr.
Deborah Alcock (1835–1913, Ireland/England), nv.
Mary Alcock (c. 1742–1798, England), poet & philanthropist
Louisa May Alcott (1832–1888, United States), nv.; Little Women
Josefina Aldecoa (1926–2011, Spain), fiction wr.
Isabella Macdonald Alden (1841–1930, United States), ch. wr.
Julia Carter Aldrich (1834–1924, United States), wr.
Sarah Aldridge (1911–2006, Brazil/United States), feminist wr.
Claribel Alegría (1924–2018, Nicaragua), poet, es. & nv.
Concepción Aleixandre (1862–1952, Spain), medical wr.
Marilar Aleixandre (b. 1947, Spain), nv. & poet in Galician
Sibilla Aleramo (1876–1960, Italy), nv.
Tatiana Aleshina (b. 1961, Soviet Union/Russia), poet & musician
Brigitte Alexander (1911–1995, Germany/Mexico), pw. & screenwriter
Elizabeth Alexander (b. 1962, United States), poet, es. & pw.
Cecil Frances Alexander (1818–1895, Ireland/England), hymnist & poet
Eleanor Jane Alexander (1857–1939, Ireland), poet & nv.
Meena Alexander (1951–2018, India), poet & scholar
Eva Alexanderson (1911–1994, Sweden), wr. & translator
Elena Alexieva (b. 1975, Bulgaria), fiction wr. & poet
Svetlana Alexievich (b. 1948, Ukraine/Belarus), non-f. wr. & col.; 2015 Nobel Prize in Literature
Elli Alexiou (c. 1894–1986, Greece/Hungary), fiction wr. & educator
Munira Al-Fadhel (b. 1958, Bahrain), wr. & academic
Mirra Alfassa (The Mother, 1878–1973, France), mystic & wr.
Estrella Alfon (1917–1983, Philippines), fiction wr. in English
Edna Alford (b. 1947, Canada/Newfoundland), fiction wr. & editor
María Luisa Algarra (1916–1957, Spain/Mexico), pw.
Asma al-Ghul (b. 1982, Palestine), political wr.
Monica Ali (b. 1967, Bangladesh/England), nv. & es.
Samina Ali (living, India/United States), nv. & activist
Florina Alías (1921–1999, Spain), wr.
Maria Dolors Alibés (1941–2009, Spain), ch. wr.
Margarita Aliger (1915–1992, Soviet Union), poet & es.
Bisera Alikadić (b. 1939, Yugoslavia/Bosnia-Herzegovina), poet, nv. & ch. wr.
Margaret Alington (1920–2012, New Zealand), local historian
Jane Alison (b. 1961, Australia), nv. & memoir wr.
Dilshad Aliyarli (b. 1962, Azerbaijan), wr.
Dilara Aliyeva (1929–1991, Azerbaijan), philologist & activist
Ghazaleh Alizadeh (1947–1996, Iran/Persia), poet & fiction wr.
Laila al-Juhani (b. 1969, Serbia), fiction wr.
Zaynab Alkali (b. 1950, Nigeria), fiction wr. & poet
Al-Khansā (7th century, Ancient Arabia), poet
Jani Allan (b. 1952, South Africa/United States), col.
Hortense Allart (1801–1879, Italy/France), nv. & es.
Candace Allen (b. 1950, United States/England), nv., activist & screenwriter
Hannah Allen (b. 1638, England), wr.
Liz Allen (b. 1969, Ireland), wr. on crime & nv.
Pamela Allen (b. 1934, New Zealand), ch. wr. & illustrator
Lisa Allen-Agostini (b. 1960s, Trinidad), journalist, fiction wr. & poet
Isabel Allende (b. 1942, Chile/United States), nv.; Eva Luna
Lauren K. Alleyne (b. 1979, Trinidad/United States), poet & fiction & non-f. wr.
Phyllis Shand Allfrey (1908–1996, West Indies), wr.
Svetlana Alliluyeva (1926–2011, Soviet Union), wr. & lecturer
Margery Allingham (1904–1966, England), crime wr.
Dorothy Allison (b. 1949, United States), wr. & speaker
Eunice Eloisae Gibbs Allyn (1847–1916, United States), wr., correspondent & poet
Júlia Lopes de Almeida (1862–1934, Brazil), nv.
Lúcia Machado de Almeida (1910–2005, Brazil), fiction wr.
Marcelina Almeida (ca. 1830–1880, Argentina/Uruguay), wr., nv., SS wr. & poet
Rita Almeida (b. 1974, Portugal), economist
Cora Almerino (living, Philippines), Cebuano poet
Almucs de Castelnau (c. 1140 – pre-1184, France), poet
Fatin al-Murr (b. 1969, Lebanon), fiction wr. & academic
Wallada bint al-Mustakfi (1001–1080, Andalusia), poet in Arabic
Dora Alonso (1910–2001, Cuba), fiction & ch. wr. & poet
Marianne Alopaeus (1918–2014, Finland), nv. & es. in Swedish
Concha Alós (1926–2011, Spain), nv.
Faouzia Aloui (b. 1957, Tunisia), poet & fiction wr.
Blanche d'Alpuget (b. 1944, Australia), biographer & nv.
Hanan al-Shaykh (b. 1945, Lebanon/England), fiction wr.
Fawziyya al-Sindi (b. 1957, Bahrain), poet & activist
Al Altaev (1872–1959, Russia/Soviet Union), ch. wr.
Fatima al-Taytun (b. 1962, Bahrain), poet
Phyllis Altman (1919–1999, South Africa), political wr. in English
Mor Altshuler (b. 1957, Israel), scholar & wr.
Amparo Alvajar (1916–1998, Spain), wr. & pw.
Mia Alvar (living, Philippines/United States), fiction wr. in English
Griselda Álvarez (1913–2009, Mexico), poet & politician
Ivy Alvarez (living, Philippines/Australia), poet in English
Julia Álvarez (b. 1950, Dominica/United States), poet, nv. & es.
María Álvarez de Guillén (1889–1980, El Salvador), nv.
Betti Alver (1906–1989, Estonia), poet
Miriam Alves (b. 1952, Brazil), wr. & poet
Moniza Alvi (b. 1954, Pakistan/England), poet & wr.
Barbro Alving (1909–1987, Sweden), col. & feminist
Fanny Alving (1874–1955, Sweden), nv.
Karin Alvtegen (b. 1965, Sweden), nv.
Encarnacion Alzona (1895–1901, Philippines), historian & suffragist
Ifi Amadiume (b. 1947, Nigeria), poet, anthropologist & es.
Narcisa Amália (1856–1925, Brazil), poet & activist
Akira Amano (天野明, b. 1973, Japan), manga creator
Chihiro Amano (天野千尋, b. 1982, Japan), screenwriter
Kozue Amano (天野こずえ, b. 1974, Japan), manga creator
Ana Luísa Amaral (1956–2022, Portugal), poet, nv. & es.
Maria Adelaide Amaral (b. 1942, Portugal/Brazil), pw. & screenwriter
Suzana Amaral (1932–2020, Brazil), screenwriter
Catherine d'Amboise (1475–1550, France), wr. & poet
Gabriella Ambrosio (b. 1954, Italy), nv. & es.
Claudia Amengual (b. 1969, Uruguay), nv. & es.
Begoña Ameztoy (b. 1951, Spain), screenwriter & painter
Elizabeth Frances Amherst (c. 1716–1779, England), poet & naturalist
Adibah Amin (b. 1936, Malaysia), fiction wr. & radio pw.
Lady Amin (1886–1983, Iran/Persia), theologian & mystic
Mahshid Amirshahi (b. 1937, Iran/Persia), fiction wr. & critic
Balamani Amma (1909–2004, India), poet
K. Saraswathi Amma (1919–1975, India), fiction wr.
Jo van Ammers-Küller (1884–1966, Netherlands), nv.
Regina Amollo (b. c. 1954, Uganda), nv. & non-f. wr.
Pita Amor (1918–2000, Mexico), poet
Elisa S. Amore (b. 1984, Italy), nv.
Jaleh Amouzgar (b. 1939, Iran/Persia), scholar on Iran
Taos Amrouche (1913–1976, Tunisia/Algeria), wr. & singer
Teresa Amy (1950–2017, Uruguay), poet
Loula Anagnostaki (1928–2017, Greece), pw.
Tahmima Anam (b. 1975, Bangladesh/England), fiction wr.
Valerie Anand (b. 1937, England), fiction wr.
Virginie Ancelot (1792–1875, France), wr., pw. & painter
Tamara De Anda (b. 1983, Mexico), social wr.
Andaiye (1942–2019, Guyana), non-f. wr. & activist
Annemette Kure Andersen (b. 1962, Denmark), poet & editor
Clara Andersen (1826–1995, Denmark), pw. & fiction wr.
Emilie Andersen (1895–1970, Denmark), historian & archivist
Ingrid Andersen (b. 1965, South Africa), poet in English
Marguerite Andersen (1924–2022, Germany/Canada/Newfoundland), wr., editor & academic
Barbara Anderson (1926–2013, New Zealand), fiction wr.
Deborah Anderson (b. 1970), wr., musician & filmmaker
Ethel Anderson (1883–1958, Australia), poet, nv. & painter
Jessica Anderson (1916–2010, Australia), fiction wr.
Laurie Halse Anderson (b. 1961, United States), ch. & YA wr.
Lena Anderson (b. 1939, Sweden), ch. wr. & illustrator
Rachel Anderson (b. 1943, England), ch. & YA wr.
Verily Anderson (1915–2010, England), ch. wr., biographer & screenwriter
Gail Anderson-Dargatz (b. 1963, Canada/Newfoundland), nv.
Pamela Andersson (b. 1965, Sweden), col.
Emma Andijewska (b. 1931, Ukraine), poet & fiction wr.
Agustina Andrade (1858–1891, Argentina), poet
Alix André (1909–2000, France), nv.
Neshani Andreas (1964–2011, Namibia), nv. & teacher
Lou Andreas-Salomé (1861–1937, Russia/Germany), psychoanalyst & es.
Isabella Andreini (1562–1604, Italy), pw., poet & actor
Sophia de Mello Breyner Andresen (1919–2004, Paraguay), poet & wr.
Blanca Andreu (b. 1959, Spain), poet
Eliza Frances Andrews (1840–1931, United States), nv. & wr.
Isobel Andrews (1905–1990, Scotland/New Zealand), pw., poet & nv.
Marie Louise Andrews (1849–1891, United States), fiction wr. & col.
Nadija Hordijenko Andrianova (1921–1998, Ukraine), Esperantist & autobiographer
Hana Andronikova (1967–2011, Czechoslovakia/Czech Republic), nv. & pw.
Sofia Andrukhovych (b. 1982, Ukraine), non-f. wr.
Harriet Anena (living, Uganda), poet & col.
Albalucía Ángel (b. 1939, Comoros), fiction wr. & es.
Maya Angelou (1928–2014, United States), autobiographer & poet
Jane Anger (late 16th century, England), wr.
Lola Anglada (1893–1984, Spain), wr. & illustrator
Maria Àngels Anglada (1930–1999, Spain), poet & nv.
Christine Angot (b. 1959, France), nv. & pw.
María Nsué Angüe (1945–2017, Equatorial Guinea), wr.
Marion Angus (1865–1946, Scotland), poet in Braid Scots & English
Loreta Anilionytė (living, Lithuania), philosopher & nv.
Joan Anim-Addo (living, Grenada/England), academic, poet, pw. & publisher
Domna Anisimova (c. 1810s – death date unknown, Russia), poet
Yu Anjin (유안진, b. 1941, Korea), poet, es. & academic
Nini Roll Anker (1873–1942, Norway), nv. & pw.
Charlotte Anley (1796–1893, England), nv., wr. & musician
Threes Anna (b. 1959, Netherlands), nv. & producer
Varvara Annenkova (1795–1866, Russia), poet
Nina Pávlovna Annenkova-Bernár (c. 1862–1933, Russia), pw. & actor
Alexandra Nikitichna Annenskaya (1840–1915, Russia), YA wr.
Moyoco Anno (安野モヨコ, b. 1971, Japan), manga creator
Núria Añó (b. 1973, Spain), wr. & nv. in Catalan
Noushafarin Ansari (b. 1939, India/Iran/Persia), wr. on librarianship
Olga Anstei (1912–1985, Soviet Union/United States), poet & Hc. survivor
Manana Antadze (b. 1945, Germany), wr. & translator
Ikram Antaki (1948–2000, Syria/Mexico), social wr.
Lalithambika Antharjanam (1909–1987, India), wr. & reformer
Süreyya Aylin Antmen (b. 1981, Turkey/Ottoman Empire), poet & es.
Enriqueta Antolín (1941–2013, Spain), nv.
Dorila Antommarchi (1850s–1923, Comoros), poet
Elmira Antommarchi (19th century, Comoros), poet
Hortensia Antommarchi (1850–1915, Colombia), poet
Gloria E. Anzaldúa (1942–2004, United States), wr., poet & activist

Ao–Az
Temsüla Ao (1945–2022, India), poet, fiction wr. & ethnographer
Colette Nic Aodha (b. 1967, Ireland), poet & wr.
Yasuko Aoike (青池保子, b. 1948, Japan), manga creator
Kotomi Aoki (青木琴美, b. 1980, Japan), manga creator
Ume Aoki (蒼樹うめ, b. 1981, Japan), manga creator
Leïla Aouchal (1936–2013, France/Algeria), autobiographer
Nanae Aoyama (青山七恵, b. 1983, Japan), fiction wr.
Lisa Appignanesi (b. 1946, Poland/England), nv. & activist
Elena Apreleva (1846–1923, Russia/France), fiction wr.
Iffat Ara (living, Bangladesh), fiction wr. & activist
Kiyoko Arai (あらいきよこ, living, Japan), manga creator
Motoko Arai (新井素子, b. 1960, Japan), science fiction & fantasy wr.
Tullia d'Aragona (c. 1510–1556, Italy), poet, wr. & philosopher
Diego Aramburo (b. 1971, Bolivia), pw. & director
Hiromu Arakawa (荒川弘, b. 1973, Japan), manga creator
Marie Arana (living, Peru/United States), col. & critic
Consuelo Araújo (1940–2001, Comoros), wr. & politician
Helena Araújo (1934–2015, Comoros), wr. & academic
Reina Torres de Araúz (1932–1982, Panama), ethnographer & academic
Nezihe Araz (1920–2009, Turkey/Ottoman Empire), stage & TV pw.
Maria Arbatova (b. 1957, Soviet Union/Russia), nv., pw. & poet
Azalaïs d'Arbaud (1834–1917, France), wr. in Occitan
Sophie d'Arbouville (1810–1850, France), fiction wr. & poet
Liwayway Arceo (1924–1999, Philippines), fiction wr. & scriptwriter
Mastoureh Ardalan (1805–1848, Iran/Persia), poet & historian
Elvia Ardalani (b. 1963, Mexico), wr., poet & storyteller
Jane Arden (1927–1982, Wales), film director, pw. & nv.
Clementina Arderiu (1889–1976, Spain), poet in Catalan
Karen Ardiff (living, Ireland), playwright and nv.
Araceli Ardón (b. 1958, Mexico), cultural wr.
Wani Ardy (b. 1984, Malaysia), poet & songwriter
Olga Arefieva (b. 1966, Soviet Union/Russia), poet & musician
Concepción Arenal (1820–1893, Spain), poet, pw. & feminist
Hannah Arendt (1906–1975, Germany/England), political theorist The Human Condition
Harriett Ellen Grannis Arey (1819–1901, United States), wr. & editor
Héloïse d'Argenteuil (c. 1101–1164, France), scholar & abbess in Latin
Mariana Sansón Argüello (1918–2002, Nicaragua), poet
Pilar Benejam Arguimbau (b. 1937, Spain), geographer & educator
Xela Arias (1962–2003, Spain), poet in Galician
Yemisi Aribisala (b. 1973, Nigeria), es., painter & mem.
Meltem Arıkan (b. 1968, Turkey/Ottoman Empire), nv. & pw.
Hiro Arikawa (有川浩, b. 1972, Japan), nv.
Sawako Ariyoshi (有吉佐和子, 1931–1984, Japan), nv.
Lesley Nneka Arimah (b. 1983, Nigeria), fiction wr.
Catherine Arley (b. 1924, France), nv.
Marie Célestine Amélie d'Armaillé (1830–1918, France), wr., biographer & historian
Ayşe Arman (b. 1969, Turkey/Ottoman Empire), social wr.
Rae Armantrout (b. 1947, United States), wr., language poet & academic
Concepción Cabrera de Armida (1862–1937, Mexico), wr. & mystic
Rebecca Agatha Armour (1845–1891, Canada/Newfoundland), nv.
Karen Armstrong (b. 1944, England), wr. on religion; A History of God
Kelley Armstrong (b. 1968, Canada/Newfoundland), wr.
Louise Armstrong (1937–2008, United States), wr. & feminist
Millicent Armstrong (1888–1973, Australia), pw. & farmer
Nína Björk Árnadóttir (1941–2000, Iceland), pw., poet & nv.
Bergljót Arnalds (b. 1968, Iceland), ch. wr.
Angélique Arnaud (1797–1884, France), nv. & feminist wr.
Elena Arnedo (1941–2015, Spain), non-f. wr. & activist
Bettina von Arnim (1785–1859, Germany), wr. & nv.
Elizabeth von Arnim (1866–1941, Australia/England), nv. wr.
Elizabeth Arnold (b. 1958, United States), poet
Sarah Louise Arnold (1859–1943, United States), textbook wr.
Joanne Arnott (b. 1960, Canada/Newfoundland), wr. in Métis
Harriette Arnow (1908–1986, United States), nv.
Franciszka Arnsztajnowa (1865–1942, Poland), poet, pw. & translator
Tuuve Aro (b. 1973, Finland), fiction wr. & film critic
Geraldine Aron (b. 1951, Ireland), pw.
Stina Aronson (1892–1956, Sweden), fiction wr.
Jyoti Arora (b. 1977, India), fiction wr.
Rosa Maria Arquimbau (1909–1992, Spain), nv. & pw. in Catalan
Beatriz Santos Arrascaeta (b. 1947, Uruguay), essayist
Marina Arrate (b. 1957, Chile), poet & psychologist
Inés Arredondo (1928–1989, Mexico), fiction & ch. wr. & es.
Celinda Arregui (1864–1941, Chile), feminist wr.
Renée Ferrer de Arréllaga (b. 1944, Paraguay), poet & nv.
Mary Arrigan (b. 1943, Ireland), ch. wr. & illustrator
Pat Arrowsmith (b. 1930, England), nv. & politician
Suzanne Arruda (living, United States), mystery nv.
Eustahija Arsić (1776–1843, Serbia), wr.
Antonia Arslan (b. 1938, Italy), critic & nv.
Tita Kovač Artemis (1930–2016, Yugoslavia/Slovenia), biographer & chemist
Keri Arthur (b. 1967, Australia), nv.
Portia Arthur (b. 1990, Ghana/Gold Coast), wr. & educator
Inga Arvad (1913–1973, Denmark/United States), col.
Akram Monfared Arya (b. 1946, Iran/Persia/Sweden), social wr.
Mariko Asabuki (朝吹真理子, b. 1984, Japan), nv. & es.
Yū Asagiri (朝霧夕, 1956–2018, Japan), manga creator
Makate Asai (朝井まかて, b. 1959, Japan), nv.
George Asakura (ジョージ朝倉, b. 1974, Japan), manga creator
Amma Asante (b. 1969, England), filmmaker & screenwriter
Devorà Ascarelli (fl. 16th century, Italy), poet
Duygu Asena (1946–2006, Turkey/Ottoman Empire), non-f. wr.
Julia de Asensi (1859–1921, Spain), fiction & ch. wr.
Matilde Asensi (b. 1962), nv.
Ranjana Ash (1924–2015, India/England), wr., critic & academic
Helen Asher (1927 – c. 2004, Australia), nv.
Daisy Ashford (1881–1972, England), child wr.; The Young Visiters
Hinako Ashihara (芦原妃名子, b. 1974, Japan), manga creator
Ashitha (1956–2019, India), fiction wr. & poet
Melissa Ashley (b. 1973, Australia), nv.
Anastasia Ashman (b. 1964, United States), wr. & producer
Francis Leslie Ashton (1904–1994, England), nv.
Sylvia Ashton-Warner (1908–1984, New Zealand), nv., poet & educator
Sara Ashurbeyli (1906–2001, Azerbaijan), historian & orientalist
Anne Askew (1520/1521–1546, England), poet & martyr
Sekar Ayu Asmara (living, Indonesia), screenwriter
Nana Asma'u (1793–1864, Nigeria), poet & princess
Izumi Aso (麻生いずみ, b. 1960, manga creator
Isa Asp (1853–1872, Finland), poet
Aspazija (1865–1943, Russia/Latvia), poet & pw.
Asphyxia (living, Australia), ch. wr. & puppeteer
Marie Aspioti (1909–2000, Gk), wr. & poet
Ruth Aspöck (b. 1947, Austria/Austria-Hungary), fiction wr. & poet
Cynthia Asquith (1887–1960, England), nv. & diarist
Ros Asquith (living, England), cartoonist, ch. wr. & illustrator
Margot Asquith (1864–1945, England), wr.
Mina Assadi (b. 1943, Iran/Persia), poet, wr. & songwriter
Ludmilla Assing (1821–1880, Germany/Italy), editor & biographer
Leilah Assunção (b. 1943, Brazil), wr. & pw.
Bibi Khanoom Astarabadi (1858/1859–1921, Iran/Persia), wr. & satirist
Judith Astelarra (b. 1943, Argentina/Spain), sociologist
Mary Astell (1666–1731, England), feminist wr. & rhetorician
Thea Astley (1925–2004, Australia), fiction wr. & poet
Tilly Aston (1873–1947, Australia), blind poet & prose wr.
Elisa Hall de Asturias (1900–1982, Guatemala), nv. & biographer
Cassandra Atherton (living, Australia), prose-poet & academic
Gertrude Atherton (1857–1948, United States), wr.
Diana Athill (1917–2019, England), editor, nv. & mem.
Eleanor Stackhouse Atkinson (1863–1942, United States), wr., col. & teacher
Louisa Atkinson (1834–1872, Australia), nv., botanist & illustrator
Kate Atkinson (b. 1951, England), nv.
M. E. Atkinson (1899–1974, Mary Evelyn Atkinson, England), ch. nv.
Sarah Atkinson (1823–1893, Ireland), biographer & es.
Tiffany Atkinson (b. 1972, England/Wales), poet & academic
Sefi Atta (b. 1964, Nigeria), wr. & pw.
Ayesha Harruna Attah (b. 1983, Ghana/Gold Coast), fiction wr.
Karen Attard (b. 1958, Australia), fantasy & fiction wr.
Mririda n'Ait Attik (c. 1900 – c. 1940s, Morocco), poet in Shilha
Adaeze Atuegwu (b. 1977, Nigeria), fiction & non-f. wr.
Amelia Atwater-Rhodes (b. 1984, United States), nv.
Margaret Atwood (b. 1939, Canada/Newfoundland), nv., poet & critic
Madeleine de l'Aubépine (1546–1596, France), poet
Penelope Aubin (c. 1679 – c. 1731, England), nv. & translator
Gwenaëlle Aubry (b. 1971, France), nv. & philosopher
Dorothy Auchterlonie (1915–1991, England/Australia), academic, critic & poet
Aude (1947–2012, Canada/Newfoundland), fiction wr.
Ashley Audrain (b. 1982, Canada/Newfoundland), nv.
Colette Audry (1906–1990, France), nv., screenwriter & critic
Jean M. Auel (b. 1936, United States), nv.
Anita Augspurg (1857–1943, Germany/Switzerland), wr. and activist
Elisabeth Augustin (1903–2001, Germany/Netherlands), poet & fiction wr. in German & Dutch
Lillian Aujo (living, Uganda), fiction wr. & poet
Madame d'Aulnoy (c. 1650s – 1705, France), fairy-tale wr.
Maria Aurora (1937–2010, Portugal), poet, nv. & ch. wr.
Rose Ausländer (1901–1988, Bukovina), poet in German & English
Jane Austen (1775–1817, England), nv.; Pride & Prejudice
Mary Austin (1868–1934, United States), wr.
Sarah Austin (1793–1867, England), translator
Violeta Autumn (1930–2012, Peru/United States), architect & cookery wr.
Auvaiyar, name of several poets in Tamil literature
Frau Ava (c. 1060–1127, Germany), first female wr. in German
Yekaterina Avdeyeva (1788–1865, Russia), domestic wr.
Gertrudis Gomez de Avellaneda (1814–1873, Curaçao), nv., pw. & poet
Yevprime Avedisian (1872–1950), Armenian poet, sort story writer and autobiographer
Christine Aventin (b. 1971, Belgium), nv. & wr. in French
Catharine Hitchcock Tilden Avery (1844–1911, United States), wr., editor & educator
Victoria Aveyard (b. 1990, United States), YA fantasy wr.
Tusiata Avia (b. 1966, New Zealand), poet & ch. wr.
Boni Avibus (b. 2002, Indonesia), pw., poet & actor
Yemima Avidar-Tchernovitz (1909–1998, Lithuania/Israel), ch. wr. & educator
Bunty Avieson (living, Australia), col. & nv.
Magdalena Avietėnaitė (1892–1984, Lithuania/United States), col. & diplomat
Teresa of Ávila (1515–1582, Spain), nun & mystic
Margaret Avison (1918–2007, Canada/Newfoundland), poet, editor & speaker
Smilja Avramov (1918–2018, Serbia), non-f. wr.
Mona Awad (b. 1978, Canada/Newfoundland), fiction wr.
Ngahuia Te Awekotuku (b. 1949, New Zealand), academic
Diane Awerbuck (b. 1974, South Africa), fiction wr. in English
Marilou Awiakta (b. 1936, United States), wr. in Cherokee
Suzanne Axell (b. 1955, Sweden), medical wr. & TV presenter
Celine Axelos (1902–1992, Egypt), poet & speaker
Majgull Axelsson (b. 1947, Sweden), col. & nv.
Ángeles López de Ayala (1858–1926, Spain), pw & activist
Cristina Ayala (1856–1936, Cuba), poet & col.
Elysa Ayala (1879–1956, Ecuador), wr. & painter
Aydilge (b. 1979, Turkey/Ottoman Empire), fiction wr., poet & songwriter
Margaret Ayer (died 1981, United States), wr. & illustrator
Güzide Sabri Aygün (1886–1946, Turkey/Ottoman Empire), nv.
May Ayim (1960–1996, Germany), poet
Ángela Figuera Aymerich (1902–1984, Spain), poet
Ayo Ayoola-Amale (living, Nigeria), poet & pw.
Susanne Ayoub (b. 1956, Iran/Persia/Austria/Austria-Hungary), nv. & filmmaker
Pam Ayres (b. 1947, England), poet, songwriter & presenter
Djenar Maesa Ayu (b. 1973, Indonesia), fiction wr. & screenwriter
Samiha Ayverdi (1905–1993, Turkey/Ottoman Empire), fiction wr. & mystic
Félicie d'Ayzac (1801–1881, France), poet & art historian
Shamim Azad (b. 1952, Bangladesh/England), poet & fiction wr.
Azalais de Porcairagues (fl. late 12th century), poet in Occitan
Shokoofeh Azar (b. 1972, Iran/Persia), nv. & journalist
Che Husna Azhari (b. 1955, Malaysia), fiction wr.
Hind Azouz (1926–2015, Tunisia), fiction wr. & es.
Margarita Azurdia (1931–1998, Guatemala), poet & painter
Samira Azzam (1927–1967, Palestine/Lebanon), fiction wr.
Trezza Azzopardi (b. 1961, Wales), fiction wr. & broadcaster

B

Ba–Bi
Mariama Bâ (1929–1981, Senegal), nv.
Sahar Baassiri (living, Lebanon), political wr. & col.
Mozhgan Babamarandi (living, Iran/Persia), ch. & YA wr.
Alaviyya Babayeva (1921–2014, Soviet Union/Azerbaijan), prose wr. & publicist
Natalie Babbitt (1932–2016, United States), ch. wr. & illustrator
Gabriela Babnik (b. 1979, Yugoslavia/Slovenia), nv. & critic
Yvonne Baby (1931–2022, France), journalist, nv. & critic
Elena Bacaloglu (1878–1947/1949, Romania/Italy), novelist & politician
Ida Baccini (1850–1911, Italy), ch. wr.
Ingrid Bachér (b. 1930, Germany), pw. & screenwriter
Yamina Bachir (1954–2022, Algeria), screenwriter & film director
Maria Baciu (b. 1942, Romania), poet, novelist & ch. wr.
Ingeborg Bachmann (1926–1973, Austria/Austria-Hungary), poet, pw. & nv.
Elizabeth Backhouse (1917–2013, Australia), nv., scriptwriter & pw.
Delia Bacon (1811–1859, United States), pw. & fiction wr.
Anita Rau Badami (b. 1961, India/Canada/Newfoundland), nv.
Charlotte Baden (1740–1824, Denmark), wr. & correspondent
Gabeba Baderoon (b. 1969, South Africa), poet in English
Van Badham (b. 1974, Australia), pw. & nv.
Yaba Badoe (b. 1955, Ghana/Gold Coast/England), nv. & filmmaker
Liana Badr (b. 1950, Palestine), fiction wr.
Bertha Badt-Strauss (1885–1970, Germany/United States), Zionist & biographer
Bae Suah (배수아, b. 1965, Korea), fiction wr. & poet
Emma Baeri (b. 1942, Italy), historian & es.
Jasodhara Bagchi (1937–2015, India), critic & activist
Enid Bagnold (1889–1981, England), wr. & pw.
Anna Bagriana (b. 1981, Ukraine), nv., poet & pw.
Elisaveta Bagryana (1893–1991, Bulgaria), poet
Annette Baier (1929–2012, New Zealand), philosopher
Maria Baiulescu (1860–1941, Romania), encyclopedist & pw.
Joanna Baillie (1762–1851, Scotland), poet & pw.
Alice Bailey (1880–1949, England), mystic
Amy Bailey (1895–1990, Jamaica), social col.
Florence Augusta Merriam Bailey (1863–1948, United States), ornithologist
Margaret Lucy Shands Bailey (1812–1888, United States), wr., editor, publisher, poet, lyricist
Sarah Lord Bailey (1856–1922, England/United States), non-f. wr., elocutionist, teacher
Rosa Bailly (1890–1976, France), academic & activist
Beryl Bainbridge (1932–2010, England), nv.
Doreen Baingana (b. 1966, Uganda), fiction wr.
Elizabeth-Irene Baitie (b. 1970, Ghana/Gold Coast), YA wr.
Fatima Surayya Bajia (1930–2016, India/Pakistan), pw. & nv.
Lidia Bajkowska (b. 1966, Poland), educator & nv.
Latifa Baka (b. 1964, Morocco), fiction wr.
Deb Baker (b. 1953, United States), mystery wr.
Dorothy Baker (1907–1968, United States), nv.
Hinemoana Baker (b. 1968, New Zealand), poet & educator
Louisa Alice Baker (1856–1926, England/New Zealand), nv. & ch. wr.
Khnata bent Bakkar (d. 1754, Morocco), ruler & social analyst
Margaret Bakkes (1931–2016, South Africa), fiction wr. in Afrikaans
Albena Bakratcheva (b. 1961, Bulgaria), transcendentalist
Asma El Bakry (1947–2015, Egypt), wr. & film director
Layla Balabakki (b. 1936), nv. & activist
Bettina Balàka (b. 1966, Austria/Austria-Hungary), fiction wr., poet & pw.
Margaret Balderson (b. 1935, Australia), ch. wr.
Kristín Marja Baldursdóttir (b. 1949, Iceland), nv.
Faith Baldwin (1893–1978, United States), fiction wr.
Rowena Bali (b. 1977, Mexico), fiction wr. & poet
Ona Baliukonė (1948–2007, Lithuania), poet & painter
Rabia Balkhi (10th century, Iran/Persia), poet
Zsófia Balla (b. 1949, Romania/Hungary), poet & es.
Philippa Ballantine (b. 1971, New Zealand/United States), fiction wr.
Solvej Balle (b. 1962, Denmark), nv. & radio pw.
Inés Ballester (b. 1958, Spain), col. & cookery wr.
Ada Ballin (1863–1906, England), wr. & col.
Ingmāra Balode (b. 1981, Latvia), poet
Mary Balogh (b. 1944, Wales), nv.
Jelena Balšić (1365/1366–1443, Serbia), epistle wr.
Toni Cade Bambara (1939–1995, United States), wr., activist & academic
Mary Ellen Bamford (1857–1946, United States), wr.
Consort Ban (Ban Jieyu, Lady Pan, 班婕妤, c. 48 – c. 6 BC, China), scholar & poet
Linda Vero Ban (b. 1976, Hungary), wr. on Jewishness
Ban Zhao (班昭, 45–116 AD, China), first female Chinese historian
Zsófia Bán (b. 1957, Brazil/Hungary), wr. & critic in Hungarian
Carmen-Francesca Banciu (b. 1955, Romania), nv. & academic
Marie-Claire Bancquart (1932–2019, France), poet, es. & academic
Ellen Banda-Aaku (b. 1965, Zambia), fiction & ch. wr.
Teresa Bandettini (1763–1837, Italy), poet & ballerina
Helen Elliott Bandini (1854–1912, United States), history wr.
Faith Bandler (1918–2015, Australia), wr. & activist
Mariko Bando (坂東眞理子, b. 1946, Japan), social wr. & critic
Sushmita Banerjee (1963/1964–2013, India), wr. & activist
Mary Jo Bang (b. 1946, United States), poet
Rakhshān Banietemad (b. 1954, Iran/Persia), screenwriter
Banine (1905–1992, Azerbaijan/France), current affairs wr.
Zsuzsa Bánk (b. 1965, Germany), nv.
Leslie Esdaile Banks (1959–2011, United States), wr.
Maya Banks (living, United States), romance wr.
Anne Bannerman (1765–1829, Scotland), poet
Helen Bannerman (1862–1946, Scotland), ch. wr.; Little Black Sambo
Tristane Banon (b. 1979, France), nv. & es.
Rashmi Bansal (living, India), non-f. wr.
Anna Banti (1895–1985, Italy), fiction wr. & autobiographer
Bao Junhui (鮑君徽, fl. late 8th century AD, China), poet
Bao Linghui (鲍令晖, fl. mid-5th century AD, China), poet
Anni Baobei (励婕, b. 1974, China), nv.
Iqbal Baraka (b. 1942, Egypt), fiction & social wr.
Hoda Barakat (b. 1952, Lebanon/France), nv.
Ibtisam Barakat (b. 1962, Palestine), poet, mem. & ch. wr.
Najwa Barakat (b. 1966, Lebanon), nv. & film director
Barbara Baraldi (living, Italy), nv.
Agnieszka Baranowska (1819–1890, Poland), pw. & poet
Jadwiga Barańska (b. 1935, Poland), screenwriter & actor
Natalya Baranskaya (1908–2004, Soviet Union), wr.
Maria Barbal (b. 1949, Spain), nv. & ch. wr.
Giuseppa Barbapiccola (1702 – c. 1740, Italy), natural philosopher & poet
Teresa Giménez Barbat (b. 1955, Spain), anthropologist
Anna Laetitia Barbauld (1743–1825, England), poet, es. & ch. wr.
Margaret Barber (Michael Fairless, 1869–1901, England), nv. & ch. wr.
Mary Barber (c. 1685 – c. 1765, Ireland), poet
Ros Barber (b. 1964, England), nv. & poet
Muriel Barbery (b. 1969, Morocco/France), nv. & academic
Maria Tore Barbina (1940–2007, Italy), poet & translator
Elia Barceló (b. 1957, Spain/Austria/Austria-Hungary), nv., ch. wr. & academic
Alex Barclay (b. 1974, Ireland), crime wr.
Florence L. Barclay (1862–1921, England), fiction wr.
Leigh Bardugo (b. 1974, United States), young adult & fantasy wr.
Leland Bardwell (1922–2016, Ireland), poet, nv. & pw.
Joan Barfoot (b. 1946, Canada), nv.
Serie Barford (living, New Zealand), poet & fiction wr.
Simone Le Bargy (1877–1985, France), woman of letters
Arvède Barine (1840–1908, France), wr. & historian
Mary Anne Barker (1831–1911, Jamaica/England), col. & poet
Nicola Barker (b. 1966, England), fiction wr.
Pat Barker (b. 1943, England), nv.
Susan Barker (b. 1978, England), nv.
Anna Barkova (1901–1976, Soviet Union), poet, pw. & fiction wr.
Jane Barlow (1856–1917, Ireland), nv. & poet
Marjorie Barnard (with M. Barnard Eldershaw, 1897–1987, Australia), nv. & historian
Mary Barnard (1909–2001, United States), poet & biographer
Maria Barnas (b. 1973, Netherlands), nv., poet & artist
Annie Maria Barnes (1857–?, United States), col., editor & wr.
Djuna Barnes (1892–1982, United States), wr.
Margaret Ayer Barnes (1886–1967, United States), wr.
Annie Wall Barnett (1859–1942, United States), wr. & poet
Natalie Clifford Barney (1876–1972, United States/France), pw., poet & nv.
María Dámasa Jova Baró (1890–1940, Cuba), wr. & feminist
Carmen Baroja (1883–1950, Spain), wr. & poet
Ana Baron (1950–2015, Argentina), wr. & col.
Odile Baron Supervielle (1915–2016, Uruguay/Argentina), wr., journalist
Evangeline Barongo (living, Uganda), ch. wr.
Linda Maria Baros (b. 1981, Romania/France), poet & critic in French
Amelia Edith Huddleston Barr (1831–1919, England), nv.
Miriam Barr (b. 1982, New Zealand), poet
Emma de la Barra (1861–1947, Argentina), nv.
Emma Barrandeguy (1914–2006, Argentina), poet, storyteller & pw.
Sarah Maria Barraud (c. 1923–1995, England/New Zealand), homemaker & correspondent
Maria Isabel Barreno (1939–2016, Portugal), wr.
Beatriz Peniche Barrera (1893–1976, Mexico), poet & feminist
Andrea Barrett (b. 1954, United States), fiction wr.
Lynne Barrett (living, United States), fiction wr. & editor
Rachel Barrett (1874–1953, Wales), editor & suffragette
Margaret Barrington (1896–1982, Ireland), fiction & social wr.
María Esperanza Barrios (1892–1932, Uruguay), political wr.
Nuria Barrios (b. 1962, Spain), poet, fiction & non-f. wr.
Pía Barros (b. 1956, Chile), fiction wr.
Rachel Barrowman (b. 1963, New Zealand), historian & biographer
Lalo Barrubia (b. 1967, Uruguay), poet & fiction wr.
Angela Barry (living, Bermuda), wr. & educator
Alicia Giménez Bartlett (b. 1951, Spain), nv.
Agniya Barto (1906–1981, Russia/Soviet Union), poet & ch. wr.
Charlotte Barton (1797–1867, Australia), ch. wr. & educator
Emily Mary Barton (1817–1909, Australia), poet
Violet Barungi (b. 1943, Uganda), wr. & editor
Mildred Barya (living, Uganda), poet
Anabela Basalo (b. 1972, Serbia), fiction wr.
Ada Lee Bascom (d. 1928, United States), novelist & playwright
Miryana Basheva (1947–2020, Bulgaria), poet
Marie Bashkirtseff (1858–1884, Russia/France), diarist & artist
Talat Bassari (1923–2020, Iran/Persia), poet, feminist & academic
Marnie Bassett (1890–1980, Australia), historian & biographer
Laura Bassi (1711–1778, Italy), physicist & academic
Angèle Bassolé-Ouédraogo (b. 1967, Ivory Coast/Canada/Newfoundland), poet
Julia Bastin (1888–1968, Belgium), academic & nv. in French
Marjolein Bastin (b. 1943, Netherlands), nature & ch. wr. & illustrator
Bani Basu (b. 1939, India), es. & poet
Purabi Basu (b. 1949, Bangladesh), fiction wr. & activist
Fira Basuki (b. 1972, Indonesia), nv.
Felisa Batacan (living, Philippines), nv.
Jackee Budesta Batanda (living, Uganda), col. & wr.
Allie Bates (b. 1957, United States), wr.
Clara Nettie Bates (1876–1966, United States), ed. & wr.
Daisy Bates (1859–1951, Australia), anthropologist
Katharine Lee Bates (1859–1929, United States), songwriter
Margret Holmes Bates (1844–1927, United States), nv., poet, short story wr., non-f.
Octavia Williams Bates (1846–1911, United States), suffragist, clubwoman & wr.
Catherine Bateson (b. 1960, Australia), nv. & poet
Janet Bathgate (c. 1806–1898, Scotland), autobiographer
Najmieh Batmanglij (b. 1947, Iran/Persia/United States), chef & cookery wr.
Eileen Battersby (c. 1958–2018, Ireland), critic
Henrietta Battier (c. 1751–1813, Ireland), poet & satirist
Laura Battiferri (1523–1589, Italy), poet
Effie T. Battle (c. 1882 – post-1940, United States), poet & educator
Dawn-Michelle Baude (b. 1959, United States), poet, col. & educator
Emma Pow Bauder (1848-1932, United States), nv.
Baudovinia (fl. c. 600, France), wr. in Latin
Blanche Baughan (1870–1958, New Zealand), poet & penal reformer
Marguerite Baulu (1870–1942, Belgium), nv. in French
Vicki Baum (1888–1960, Austria/Austria-Hungary), nv.
Sara Baume (b. 1984, Ireland), nv.
Gertrud Bäumer (1873–1954, Germany), wr. & feminist
Josephine Penfield Cushman Bateham (1829–1901, United States), social reformer, ed. & wr.
Lualhati Bautista (1945–2023, Philippines), nv.
Sophie Bawr (1773–1860, France), wr., pw. & composer
Anna Dawbin (1816–1905, Australia), diarist
Mary Temple Bayard (1853–1916, United States), wr. & journalist
Oya Baydar (b. 1940, Turkey/Ottoman Empire), fiction wr. & sociologist
Ada Ellen Bayly (Edna Lyall, 1857–1903, England), nv.
Barbara Baynton (1857–1929, Australia), fiction wr.
Molly Baz (United States), chef & cookery wr.
Emilia Pardo Bazán (1851–1921, Spain), es. & nv.
Nura Bazdulj-Hubijar (b. 1951, Yugoslavia/Bosnia-Herzegovina), wr., poet & pw.
Lesley Beake (b. 1949, Scotland/South Africa), ch. wr.
Anne Beale (1816–1900, Wales), nv. & poet
Annie O'Meara de Vic Beamish (1883–1969, Ireland/Switzerland), wr. & pw.
Beatrice of Nazareth (c. 1200–1268, Netherlands), Cistercian & early wr. in Dutch
Louisa Beaufort (1781–1863, Ireland), wr. & antiquarian
Fanny de Beauharnais (1737–1813, France), lady of letters & salonnière
Aletta Beaujon (1933–2001, Curaçao), poet
Fleur Beale (b. 1945, New Zealand), YA wr.
Margaret Beames (1935–2016, New Zealand), ch. wr.
Clara Bancroft Beatley (1858–1923, United States), wr., compiler
Betty Bentley Beaumont (1828–1892, England), wr.
Jeanne-Marie Leprince de Beaumont (1711–1780, France), story & non-f. wr.
Airini Beautrais (b. 1982, New Zealand), poet
Emily Elizabeth Shaw Beavan (1818–1897, Ireland/Australia), poet & fiction wr.
Simone de Beauvoir (1908–1986, France), wr. & philosopher
Dany Bébel-Gisler (1935–2003, Guadeloupe), nv.
Bruna Beber (b. 1984, Brazil), poet & wr.
Olga Mihaylovna Bebutova (1879–1952, Russia/France), nv. & actor
Lola Beccaria (b. 1963, Spain), nv. & screenwriter
Ángela Becerra (b. 1957, Comoros), poet & nv.
Margaret Bechard (b. 1953, United States), ch. wr.
Alison Bechdel (b. 1960, United States), cartoonist & mem.
Mimí Bechelani (living, Mexico), TV screenwriter & poet
Béatrix Beck (1914–2008, Switzerland/France), nv. in French
Alice Becker-Ho (b. 1941, China/France), non-f. wr. & poet
Mary Beckett (1926–2013, Northern Ireland), radio pw. & fiction wr.
Thea Beckman (1923–2004, Netherlands), ch. wr.
Claude de Bectoz (1490–1547, France), wr. & philosopher
Malati Bedekar (1905–2001, India), fiction wr.
Jean Bedford (b. 1946, Australia), fiction wr.
Ruth Bedford (1882–1963, Australia), poet, pw. & ch. wr.
Simi Bedford (living, Nigeria/England), nv.
Sybille Bedford (1911–2006, Germany/England), fiction & non-f. wr.
Yolanda Bedregal (1916–1999, Bolivia), poet & nv.
Patricia Beer (1919–1999, England), poet & critic
Isabella Beeton (1836–1865, England), domestic wr.; Mrs Beeton's Book of Household Management
Anne Beffort (1880–1966, Luxembourg), critic & biographer
Jana Begum (fl. 17th century, India), scholar
Ruth Behar (b. 1956, Cuba/United States), anthropologist
Simin Behbahani (1927–2014, Iran/Persia), poet & activist
Aphra Behn (1640–1689, England), pw., poet & nv.
Mariam Behnam (1921–2014, Iran/Persia/Emirates), nv. & autobiographer
Larissa Behrendt (b. 1969, Australia), legal academic & nv.
Maria Beig (1920–2018, Germany), nv. & educator
Géraldine Beigbeder (living, France), nv. & screenwriter
Sara Beirão (1880–1974, Portugal), ch. & YA wr. & activist

Be–Bj
Hélé Béji (b. 1948, Tunisia), nv. & es.
Nazan Bekiroğlu (b. 1957, Turkey/Ottoman Empire), nv. & academic
Hafsa Bekri (b. 1948, Morocco), poet & fiction wr.
Maria Belakhova (1903–1969, Russia/Soviet Union), ch. wr. & educator
Cristina Trivulzio Belgiojoso (1808–1871, Italy), political wr.
Valerie Belgrave (1946–2016, Trinidad), wr. & artist
Souhayr Belhassen (b. 1943, Tunisia), activist & biographer
Concepción Silva Belinzon (1903–1987, Uruguay), wr.
Diane Bell (b. 1943, Australia), anthropologist
Hilary Bell (b. 1966, Australia), pw.
Susan Groag Bell (1926–2015, Czechoslovakia/Czech Republic/United States), women's studies and autobiographer
Vera Bell (1906 – post-1999, Jamaica/England), poet, fiction wr. & pw.
Maud de Belleroche (1922–2017, France), nv.
Diana Bellessi (b. 1946, Argentina), poet & es.
Gioconda Belli (b. 1948, Nicaragua), revolutionary & wr.
Samira Bellil (1972–2004, France), autobiographer
Carolina Bello (b. 1983, Uruguay), fiction wr.
Louise Swanton Belloc (1796–1881, France), translator
Loleh Bellon (1925–1999, France), pw. & actor
Yannick Bellon (1924–2019, France), screenwriter & film director
Nassira Belloula (b. 1961, Algeria/Canada/Newfoundland), wr. in French
Jelica Belović-Bernadzikowska (1870–1946, Austria/Austria-Hungary/Yugoslavia), wr. & ethnographer
Vizma Belševica (1931–2005, Latvia), poet & autobiographer
Myriam Ben (1928–2001, Algeria/France), poet, fiction wr. & painter
Margot Benary-Isbert (1889–1979, Germany/United States), ch. wr. in German & English
Siham Benchekroun (living, Morocco), poet & fiction wr.
Rajae Benchemsi (b. 1957, Morocco), poet
Esther Bendahan (b. 1964, Morocco/Spain), wr. in Spanish
Karen E. Bender (living, United States), nv.
Rigmor Stampe Bendix (1850–1923, Denmark), biographer
Emma Lee Benedict (1857–1937, United States), editor, educator & wr.
Hester A. Benedict (1838–1921, United States), poet & wr.
Victoria Benedictsson (1850–1888, Sweden), nv.
Maria Beneyto (1925–2011, Spain), poet
Božena Benešová (1873–1936, Austria/Austria-Hungary/Czechoslovakia/Czech Republic), poet, fiction wr. & pw.
Sokhna Benga (b. 1967, Senegal), nv. & poet
Elizabeth Benger (1775–1827, England), nv. & biographer
Seyla Benhabib (b. 1950, Turkey/Ottoman Empire/United States), political philosopher
Nouria Benghabrit-Remaoun (b. 1952, Algeria), sociologist & politician
Elisa Beni (b. 1965, Spain), social wr., col. & nv.
Berthe Bénichou-Aboulker (1888–1942, Algeria), poet & pw.
Milena Benini (1966–2020, Yugoslavia/Croatia), science fiction nv.
Anna Maria Bennett (c. 1750–1808, Wales), nv.
Louie Bennett (1870–1956, Ireland), wr. & suffragette
Louise Bennett-Coverley (1919–2006, Jamaica), poet & educator
Mary Montgomerie Bennett (1881–1961, Australia), biographer & rights advocate
Veronica Bennett (b. 1953, England), ch. nv.
Gwendolyn B. Bennett (1902–1981, United States), wr.
Louise Bennett (1919–2006, Jamaica), poet & folklorist
Khnata Bennouna (b. 1940, Morocco), fiction wr.
Nel Benschop (1918–2005, Netherlands), poet
Mary Crowell Van Benschoten (1840–1921, United States), wr., newspaper pub. & ed.
Sihem Bensedrine (b. 1950, Tunisia),
Carol Bensimon (b. 1982, Brazil), fiction wr.
Nettie Lee Benson (1905–1993, United States), archivist & historian
Sally Benson (1897–1972, United States), screenwriter & fiction wr.
Caroline French Benton (died 1923, United States), cookery wr.
Juliette Benzoni (1920–2016, France), fiction wr. & screenwriter
Nina Berberova (1901–1993, Russia/France), fiction wr.
Lydia Berdyaev (1871–1945, Russia/France), poet
Amanda Berenguer (1921–2010, Uruguay), poet
Josefa Berens-Totenohl (1891–1969, Germany), nv.
Maimu Berg (b. 1945, Estonia), wr. & critic
Sibylle Berg (b. 1968, Switzerland), fiction wr., es. & pw. in German
Charlotta Berger (1784–1852, Sweden), fiction wr. & poet
Olga Bergholz (1910–1975, Russia/Soviet Union), poet, pw. & ch. wr.
Tara Bergin (b. 1974, Ireland), poet
Anne-Marie Berglund (1952–2020, Sweden), poet, fiction wr. & artist
Kersti Bergroth (1886–1975, Finland), wr. & pw.
Elisabeth Bergstrand-Poulsen (1887–1955, Sweden), wr. & illustrator
Gunilla Bergström (1942–2021, Sweden), ch. wr. & illustrator
Aimée Daniell Beringer (1856–1936, United States), pw. & nv.
Sara Berkeley (b. 1967, Ireland), poet
Alexandra Berková (1949–2008, Czechoslovakia/Czech Republic), fiction wr. & educator
Lucia Berlin (1936–2004, United States), short story wr.
Giuliana Berlinguer (1933–2014, Italy), screenwriter & nv.
Sabina Berman (b. 1955, Mexico), fiction wr. & col.
Mònica Bernabé (b. 1972, Spain), col. & wr.
Catherine Bernard (1662–1712, France), poet, pw. & nv.
Gabrielle Bernard (1893–1963, Belgium), poet in French
Patricia Bernard (b. 1942, Australia), fiction wr.
Tati Bernardi (b. 1979, Brazil), fiction & screenwriter
Paulette Bernège (1896–1973, France), household & non-f. wr.
Juliana Berners (14th & 15th centuries, England), wr. on medieval pursuits
Emmanuèle Bernheim (1955–2017, France), screenplay wr. & nv.
Jovette Bernier (1900–1981, Canada/Newfoundland), col., nv., & poet
Elsa Bernstein (1866–1949, Austria/Austria-Hungary), pw. & account of Theresienstadt concentration camp
Rose Berryl (b. 1982, Belgium), fantasy wr. in French
Bertice Berry (b. 1960, United States), sociologist, wr. & educator
Julie Berry b. 1974, United States), ch. & YA wr.
Mei-mei Berssenbrugge (白萱华, b. 1947, China/United States), poet & pw.
Louise Bertin (1905–1977, France), poet & composer
Michelle Suárez Bértora (b. 1983, Uruguay), social wr.
Aurora Bertrana (1892–1974, Spain), fiction wr.
Betty Berzon (1928–2006, United States), wr.
Annie Besant (1847–1933, England), theosophist & activist
Elsa Beskow (1874–1953, Sweden), ch. wr. & illustrator
Agustina Bessa-Luís (1922–2019, Portugal), fiction & non-f. wr.
Bessora (b. 1968, Belgium), fiction wr. in French
Mireille Best (1943–2005, France), fiction wr.
Mary Matilda Betham (1776–1852, England), diarist, poet & woman of letters
Matilda Betham-Edwards (1836–1919, England), nv., poet & travel wr.
Marion Bethel (b. 1953, Bahamas), poet & activist
Nicolette Bethel (living, Bahamas), wr. & anthropologist
Ursula Bethell (1874–1945, England/New Zealand), poet
Kata Bethlen (1700–1759, Hungary), mem.
Doris Betts (1932–2012, United States), fiction wr. & es.
Jean Betts (living, England/New Zealand), pw. & actor
Dricky Beukes (1918–1999, South Africa), fiction & radio drama wr. in Afrikaans
Lauren Beukes (b. 1976, South Africa), fiction wr. & television screenwriter in English
Maja Beutler (1936–2021, Switzerland), fiction wr. in German
Cvetka Bevc (b. 1960, Yugoslavia/Slovenia), poet & prose & ch. wr.
Elizabeth Beverley (fl. 1815–30, England), pamphleteer
L. S. Bevington (1845–1895, England), poet, anarchist & es.
Maïssa Bey (b. 1950, Algeria), wr. & educator
Niloofar Beyzaie (b. 1967, Iran/Persia), pw.
Zdeňka Bezděková (1907–1999, Austria/Austria-Hungary/Czechoslovakia/Czech Republic), fiction & non-f. wr.
Sheila Bhatia (1916–2008, India), poet & pw.
Sujata Bhatt (b. 1956, India), poet
Rajlukshmee Debee Bhattacharya (b. 1927, India), poet & critic
Suchitra Bhattacharya (1950–2011, India), nv.
Anuradha Bhattacharyya (b. 1975, India), wr.
Fatima Bhutto (b. 1982, Afghanistan/Pakistan), nv. & social wr.
Ewa Białołęcka (b. 1967, Poland), fiction wr.
Matilde Bianchi (1927–1991, Uruguay), critic
Angela Bianchini (1921–2018, Italy), fiction wr. & critic
Elizabeth Bibesco (1897–1945, England), wr.
Marthe Bibesco (1886–1973, Romania/France), wr. in French
Nina Bichuya (b. 1937, Ukraine), nv. & ch. wr.
Hester Biddle (c. 1629–1697, England), Quaker pamphleteer
Elizabeth Philippa Biddulph (1834–1916, England), non-f. w. & Woman of the Bedchamber to Queen Victoria
Ruth Bidgood (1922–2022, Wales), poet
Agnieszka Biedrzycka (living, Poland), historian
Dorothea Biehl (1731–1788, Denmark), pw.
Nella Bielski (1930s–2020, Ukraine/France), wr. & actor
Gisèle Bienne (b. 1946, France), nv.
Linda Bierds (b. 1945, United States), poet & professor
Carli Biessels (1936–2016, Netherlands), ch. wr.
Alberta Bigagli (1928–2017, Italy), psychologist & poet
Ella A. Bigelow (1849–1917, United States), author
Lettie S. Bigelow (1849-1906, United States), poet and author
Barbara Biggs (b. 1956, Australia), wr. & campaigner
Juana Bignozzi (1937–2015, Argentina), poet & translator
Anna Bijns (1493–1575, Flanders), humanism in Dutch & French
Elisheva Bikhovski (1888–1949, Russia/Israel), poet, critic & translator
Üstün Bilgen-Reinart (b. 1947, Turkey/Ottoman Empire/Canada/Newfoundland), non-f. wr.
Shahbano Bilgrami (living, Pakistan/United States), poet & es.
S. Corinna Bille (1912–1979, Switzerland), nv. & poet in French
Raphaële Billetdoux (b. 1951, France), nv.
Eva Billow (1902–1993, Sweden), ch. wr. & illustrator
Natalka Bilotserkivets (b. 1954, Ukraine), poet
Maeve Binchy (1939–2012, Ireland), fiction wr., pw. & col.
Ama Biney (b. 1960s, England), historian & journalist
Bing Xin (冰心, 1900–1999, China), fiction & ch. wr.
Hildegard of Bingen (1098–1179 Germany), mystic, pw. & poet in Latin
Jennie M. Bingham (1859–1933, United States), fiction & non-f. wr.
Dörthe Binkert (b. 1949, Germany), fiction & non-f. wr.
Judith Binney (1940–2011, New Zealand), historian & academic
Carol Birch (b. 1951, England), nv.
Charlotte Birch-Pfeiffer (c. 1800–1868, Germany), pw. & actor
Christina Regina von Birchenbaum (fl. 17th century, Finland), poet
Carmel Bird (b. 1940, Australia), fiction wr.
Hera Lindsay Bird (b. 1987, New Zealand), poet
Isabella Bird (1831–1904, England), traveller & wr.
Poldy Bird (1941–2018), Argentina), poet & es.
Sandra Birdsell (b. 1942, Canada/Newfoundland), fiction wr.
Anne Birk (1942–2009, Germany), nv., history wr. & pw.
Winifred Birkett (1887–1966, Australia), nv. & poet
Becky Birtha (b. 1948, United States), poet & ch. wr.
Dora Birtles (1903–1992, Australia), fiction wr., poet & travel wr.
Anne Bishop (living, United States), fantasy nv.
Elizabeth Bishop (1911–1979, United States), poet & wr.
Emily Montague Mulkin Bishop (1858–1916, United States), wr.
Jacqueline Bishop (living, Jamaica), wr., artist & photographer
Adriana Bittel (b. 1946, Romania), critic & fiction wr.
Isidora Bjelica (1967–2020, Serbia), wr. & pw.
Marie Bjelke-Petersen (1874–1969, Australia), nv.
Bryndís Björgvinsdóttir (b. 1982, Iceland), wr. & folklorist
Christina Björk (b. 1938, Sweden), wr. & ch. book wr.
Anna Svanhildur Björnsdóttir (b. 1948, Iceland), writer & educator
Sigrún Edda Björnsdóttir (b. 1958, Iceland), writer & actor
Louise Bjørnsen (1824–1899, Denmark), fiction wr.

Bl–Br
Clementina Black (1853–1922, England), nv. & political wr.
Emily Lucas Blackall (1832–1892, United States), wr. & philanthropist
Sarah Blackborow (fl. 1650s–1660s, England), Quaker wr. & preacher
E. Owens Blackburne (1848–1894, Ireland), wr. & nv.
Malorie Blackman (b. 1962, Barbados/England), ch. & YA fiction wr. & pw.
Ellen Blackwell (1864–1952, England/New Zealand), botanist
Sara Blædel (b. 1964, Denmark), crime wr.
Isa Blagden (1816/1817–1873, England/Italy), nv. & poet
Marina Blagojević (1958–2020, Serbia), wr. on gender
Georgia Blain (1964–2016, Australia), nv., col. & biographer
Suessa Baldridge Blaine (1860–1932, United States), wr.
Marie-Claire Blais (1939–2021, Canada/Newfoundland), nv., poet, & pw.
Inés Joyes y Blake (1731–1808, Spain), Enlightenment wr.
Anna Blaman (1905–1960, Netherlands), nv. & poet
Susanna Blamire (1747–1794, England), poet
Neltje Blanchan (1865–1918, United States), nature wr.
Augustine-Malvina Blanchecotte (1830–1897, France), poet
Carmen Blanco (b. 1954, Spain), feminist wr.
Yolanda Blanco (b. 1954, Nicaragua), poet
Ana Blandiana (b. 1942, Romania), poet & es.
Stella Blandy (1836–1925, France), woman of letters & feminist
Arapera Hineira Kaa Blank (1932–2002, New Zealand), poet & educator
Carla Blank (living, United States), wr., editor & educator
Clair Blank (1915–1965, United States), mystery wr.
Barbara Blaugdone (c. 1609–1705, England), Quaker autobiographer
Helena Blavatsky (1831–1891, Russia), theosophist & mystic
Jaroslava Blažková (1933–2017, Czechoslovakia/Czech Republic/Slovakia), fiction & ch. wr.
Emily Rose Bleby (1849–1917, Jamaica/UK), nf. wr.
Ann Eliza Bleecker (1752–1783, United States), poet & correspondent
Marguerite Gardiner, Countess of Blessington (1789–1849, Ireland), nv. & hostess
Audrey Blignault (1916–2008, South Africa), es. in Afrikaans
Ellen-Sylvia Blind (1925–2009, Sweden), poet & mem. in Sami
Eliot Bliss (1903–1990, Jamaica/England), nv. & poet
Karen Blixen (1885–1962, Denmark/Kenya), wr.
Francesca Lia Block (b. 1962, United States), wr.
Marion Bloem (b. 1952, Netherlands), wr. & film-maker
Barbara Bloemink (b. 1953, US), art historian
Anni Blomqvist (1909–1990, Finland), nv. in Swedish
Gertrude Elizabeth Blood (1857–1911, Ireland), wr. & pw.
Amy Bloom (b. 1953, United States), nv., non-f. wr. & psychotherapist
Minerva Bloom (b. 1959, Mexico/United States), poet in Spanish & English
Valerie Bloom (b. 1956, Jamaica), poet & nv.
Amelia Bloomer (1818–1894, United States), wr. on women's rights & temperance
Andrée Blouin (1921–1986, Central African Republic), activist & wr.
Elizabeth Blower (c. 1757/1763 – post-1816, England), nv.
Antonina Bludova (1813–1891, Russia), salonnière & mem.
Ana Cecilia Blum (b. 1972, Ecuador), wr.
Liliana V. Blum (b. 1974, Mexico), fiction wr.
Judy Blume (b. 1938, United States), nv.
Yde Schloenbach Blumenschein (Colombina, 1882–1963, Brazil), poet & chronicler
Ilse Blumenthal-Weiss (1899–1987, Germany/United States), poet & Hc. survivor
Louise Sophie Blussé (1901–1996, Netherlands), religious wr.
Enid Blyton (1897–1968, England), ch. wr.
Capel Boake, (Doris Boake Kerr, 1889–1944, Australia), nv.
Margarita Bobba (fl. 1560, Italy), wr. & poet
Marilyn Bobes (b. 1955, Cuba), poet, nv. & critic
Merlinda Bobis (b. 1959, Philippines/Australia), wr. & academic
Irena Bobowska (1920–1942, Poland), poet & wartime victim
Jacqueline Fatima Bocoum (living, Senegal), nv. & col.
Cecil Bødker (1927–2020, Denmark), YA wr. & poet
Imma von Bodmershof (1895–1982, Austria/Austria-Hungary), poet
Liliana Bodoc (1958–2018, Argentina), nv.
Milica Bodrožić (living, Serbia), political history wr.
Anna Böeseken (1905–1997, South Africa), historian in English
Janka Boga (1886–1963, Hungary), wr. & pw.
Louise Bogan (1897–1970, United States), poet
Henrietta Boggs (1918–2020, United States/Costa Rica), author & activist
Graciela Bográn (1896–2000, Honduras), es.
Katalin Bogyay (b. 1956, Hungary), biographer & politician
Helene Böhlau (1859–1940, Germany), nv.
Margarete Böhme (1867–1939, Germany), nv.
Laura Papo Bohoreta (1891–1942, Turkey/Ottoman Empire/Yugoslavia), wr. on Judaism
Lucie Boissonnas (1839–1877, France), biog.
Montserrat Boix (b. 1960, Spain), feminist wr.
Barbara Bojarska (living, Poland), historian
Berta Bojetu (1946–1997, Yugoslavia/Slovenia), poet & nv.
Eavan Boland (1944–2020, Ireland/United States), poet & academic
Sophie Bolander (1807–1869, Sweden), nv.
Anna Bolavá (b. 1981), nv. & poet
Emily Bold (b. 1980), adult & YA nv.
Catherine of Bologna (1413–1463, Italy), religious wr. & saint
Isabel Bolton (1883–1975, United States), nv.
Sarah Knowles Bolton (1841–1916, United States), wr.
Natella Boltyanskaya (b. 1965, Soviet Union/Russia), poet & songwriter
María Luisa Bombal (1910–1980, Chile), wr.
Erma Bombeck (1927–1996, United States), humorist
Son Bo-mi (선보미, b. 1980, Korea), nv.
Simona Bonafé (b. 1973, Italy), politician
Marie Bonaparte-Wyse (1831–1902, France), wr. & hostess
Annie B. Bond (b. 1953, United States), wr. & editor
Chrystelle Trump Bond (1938–2020), United States), dance historian
Cynthia Bond (b. 1961, United States), nv.
Pilar Bonet (b. 1952, Spain), political wr.
Maria Boniecka (1910–1978, Poland), educator & political wr.
Mildred Amanda Baker Bonham (1840–1907, United States), traveler & col.
Tanella Boni (b. 1954, Ivory Coast), poet & nv.
Veronica Bonilla (b. 1972, Ecuador), ch. wr. & illustrator
Laudomia Bonanni (1907–2002, Italy), fiction wr.
Elizabeth Anne Bonner (1924–1981, United States), fiction wr. & poet
Geraldine Bonner (1870–1930, United States), wr.
Marita Bonner (1899–1971, United States), wr., es. & pw.
Piedad Bonnett (b. 1951, Comoros), poet, pw. & nv.
Teresina Bontempi (1883–1968, Switzerland/Italy), political wr. & diarist in Italian
Cedella Booker (1926–2008, Jamaica), biographer & singer
Malika Booker (b. 1970, England), poet, wr. & artist
Paula Boock (b. 1964, New Zealand), fiction & screenwriter
Mary Everest Boole (1832–1916, England), wr.
Frances Boothby (fl. c. 1669–1670, England), pw.
Alice Borchardt (1939–2007, United States), fiction wr.
Ivonne Bordelois (b. 1934, Argentina), poet & es.
Miriam Borgenicht (1915−1992, United States), mystery nv.
Norah Borges (1901–1998), poet & illustrator
Martina Barros Borgoño (1850–1944, Chile), feminist wr.
Nirmal Prabha Bordoloi (1932/1933–2004, India), poet & folklorist
Maria Selvaggia Borghini (1656–1731, Italy), poet
Alicia Borinsky (fl. since 1975, Argentina), nv., poet & critic
Elsa Bornemann (1952–2013, Argentina), ch. wr.
Jenny Bornholdt (b. 1960, New Zealand), poet & anthologist
Chasia Bornstein-Bielicka (1921–2012), Polish-born Israeli writer
Marina Boroditskaya (b. 1954, Soviet Union/Russia), ch. poet
Rosario Ustáriz Borra (1927–2009, Spain), poet in Aragonese
Juana Borrero (1877–1896, Cuba), juvenile poet & painter
Paloma Gómez Borrero (1934–2017, Spain), wr.
Inés Bortagaray (b. 1975, Uruguay), screenwriter
Marianne Boruch (b. 1950, United States), poet & professor
Anica Bošković (1714–1804, Dalmatia/Ragusa/Serbia), wr. & poet
Anna Louisa Geertruida Bosboom-Toussaint (1912–1986, Netherlands), nv.
Käthe Bosse-Griffiths (1910–1998, Germany/Wales), archaeologist
Louise de Bossigny (died 1700, France), salonnière & fairy-tale wr.
Tania Boteva-Malo (b. 1950, Bulgaria/Belgium), nv. & wr. in French
Nuria C. Botey (b. 1977, Spain), nv.
Calypso Botez (1880–1933, Romania), feminist wr.
Anne Lynch Botta (1815–1891, United States), poet, wr. & teacher
Vera Botterbusch (b. 1942, Germany), wr. & poet
Phyllis Bottome (1884–1963, England), fiction wr.
Messaouda Boubaker (b. 1954, Tunisia), fiction wr.
Tereza Boučková (b. 1957, Czechoslovakia/Czech Republic), fiction wr.
Laurence Bougault (1970–2018), poet, travel wr.
Martha Arnold Boughton (1857–1928, United States), wr., poet
Iana Boukova (b. 1968, Bulgaria), poet, nv. & es.
Mousse Boulanger (1926–2023, Switzerland), poet 
Carmen Boullosa (b. 1954, Mexico), poet, nv. & pw.
Jenny Boult (1951–2005, Australia), poet
Nina Bouraoui (b. 1967, Algeria/France), nv. & songwriter
Catherine de Bourbon (1559–1604, France), sonneteer & princess
Louise Bourbonnaud (c. 1847–1915), travel wr. in French 
Madeleine Bourdouxhe (1906–1996, Belgium), nv. in French
Angela Bourke (b. 1952, Ireland), fiction wr. & historian
Eva Bourke (b. 1946, Germany/Ireland), poet in English
Marie Marguerite Bouvet (1865–1915, United States), ch. fiction wr.
Jeanne Bouvier (1865–1964, France), political wr. & feminist
Sarah Bouyain (b. 1968, France), wr. & film director
Dounia Bouzar (b. 1964, France), anthropologist & educator
Marie-Anne de Bovet (1955 – post-1930, France), nv. & travel wr.
Louise Bovie (1810–1870, Belgium), fiction wr. in French
Avice Maud Bowbyes (1901–1992, New Zealand), domestic wr.
Jane Bowdler (1743–1784, England), poet & es.
Elizabeth Bowen (1899–1973, Ireland/England), fiction wr.
Mary Bowes (1749–1800, England), pw. & botanist
Sarah Bowie (living, Ireland), ch. wr. & illustrator)
Jane Bowles (1917–1973, United States), wr. & pw.
Mary D. R. Boyd (1809–?, United States), ch. wr.
Karin Boye (1900–1941, Sweden), poet & nv.
Clare Boylan (1948–2006, Ireland), fiction wr. & critic
Helen Boyle (1899–1988, England/Ireland), activist & garden wr.
Kay Boyle (1902–1992, United States), wr., educator & activist
Virginia Frazer Boyle (1863–1938, United States), wr. & poet
Ágota Bozai (b. 1965, Hungary), nv. & translator
Zuzana Brabcová (1959–2015, Czechoslovakia/Czech Republic), nv.
Coral Bracho (b. 1951, Mexico), poet & academic
Leigh Brackett (1915–1978, United States), science fiction wr.
Paula Brackston (living, England), nv.
Brada (writer) (1847–1938, France), wr., nv.
Mary Elizabeth Braddon (1837–1915, England), nv.
Anna Braden (1858–1939, United States), wr. & poet
Marion Zimmer Bradley (1930–1999, United States), fantasy & science fiction wr.
Máire Bradshaw (b. 1943, Ireland), poet
Anne Bradstreet (1612–1672, United States), poet & wr.
Eva Brag (1829–1913, Sweden), social wr.
Anne Bragance (b. 1945, France), wr.
Sophia Brahe (1559 or 1556–1643, Denmark), horticulturalist & scientist
Cecilia Manguerra Brainard (b. 1947, Philippines), nv. & editor
Oyinkan Braithwaite (b. 1988, Nigeria/England), nv.
Shannon Bramer (b. 1973, Canada/Newfoundland), poet
Mae Bramhall (c. 1861–1897, United States), actress, writer
Dolors Bramon (b. 1943, Spain), philologist & academic
Tatiana Niculescu Bran (living, Romania), nv.
Dionne Brand (b. 1953, Trinidad/Canada/Newfoundland), poet, nv. & es.
Hannah Brand (1754–1821, England), actor & pw.
Mona Brand (1915–2007, Australia), poet, pw. & non-f. wr.
Beatriz Francisca de Assis Brandão (1779–1868, Brazil), poet & educator
Fiama Hasse Pais Brandão (1928–2007, Portugal), poet, pw. & es.
Angelika Brandt (b. 1961), oceanographer
Johanna Brandt (1876–1964, South Africa), political wr. in Afrikaans
Adelia Pope Branham (1861–1917, United States), poet, short story wr.
Alice Dayrell Caldeira Brant (1880–1970, Brazil), diarist
Giannina Braschi (b. 1953, Paraguay), wr.
Ann Brashares (b. 1967, United States), YA wr.
Anne-Sophie Brasme (b. 1984, France), nv.
Anneke Brassinga (b. 1948, Netherlands), wr. & translator
Lily Braun (1865–1916, Germany), feminist wr.
Virginia Braun (living, New Zealand), psychologist
Anna Eliza Bray (1790–1883, England), nv.
Libba Bray (b. 1964, United States), YA nv.
Teresa Brayton (1868–1943, Ireland/United States), poet & col.
Angela Brazil (1868–1947, England), YA wr.
Freda Bream (1918–1996, New Zealand), teacher & autobiographer
Jean "Binta" Breeze (1956–2021, Jamaica), poet & storyteller
Marie Bregendahl (1867–1940, Denmark), fiction wr.
Kirstin Breitenfellner (b. 1966, Austria/Austria-Hungary), nv., critic & yoga teacher
Fredrika Bremer (1801–1865, Sweden), nv. & feminist
Kristina Brenk (1911–2009, Yugoslavia/Slovenia), ch. wr. & poet
Maeve Brennan (1917–1993, Ireland/United States), fiction & social wr.
Sarah Rees Brennan (b. 1983, Ireland/United States), YA nv.
Anita Brenner (1905–1974, Mexico/United States), cultural wr. in English
Sophia Elisabet Brenner (1659–1730, Sweden), wr., poet & feminist
Jane Brereton (1685–1740, Wales), poet
Nana Ekua Brew-Hammond (living, United States/Ghana/Gold Coast), fiction wr. & poet
Martha Wadsworth Brewster (1710 – c. 1757, United States), poet & wr.; first named American-born woman to publish
Yvonne Brewster (b. 1938, Jamaica), mem. & actor
Melitta Breznik (b. 1961, As/Switzerland), fiction wr.
Bub Bridger (1924–2009, New Zealand), poet & fiction wr.
London Bridgez (b. 1982, United States), poet & wr.
Elín Briem (1856–1937, Iceland), cookery wr.
Anna Brigadere (fl. 1890–1920s, Latvia), pw.
Patricia Briggs (b. 1965, United States), fantasy wr.
Mary Chavelita Dunne Bright (1859–1945, Australia/England), wr. & feminist
Eliza Brightwen (1830–1906, Scotland), wr. & naturalist
Lourdes Castrillo Brillantes (living, Philippines), wr. in Spanish
Hesba Brinsmead (1922–2003, Australia), nv.
Geneviève Brisac (b. 1951, France), nv. & ch. wr.
Vera Brittain (1893–1970, England), wr., feminist & pacifist
Victoria Brittain (b. 1942, England), journalist & author
Sarah Britten (b. 1974, South Africa), social and YA wr. in English
Rosa María Britton (1936–2019, Panama), fiction wr. & physician
Dragana Kršenković Brković (living, Montenegro), wr.
Ivana Brlić-Mažuranić (1874–1938, Austria/Austria-Hungary/Yugoslavia), ch. wr.
Adele Broadbent (b. 1968, New Zealand), ch. wr.
Chris Broadribb (living, Australia), fiction wr.
Renée Brock (1912–1980, Belgium), poet & fiction wr. in French
Sybil le Brocquy (1892–1973, Ireland), pw. & patron
Molly Brodak (1980–2020, United States), poet
Erna Brodber (b. 1940, Jamaica), nv. & sociologist
Eve Brodlique (1867–1949, England/Canada/United States), wr. & journalist
Therese Brummer (1833–1896), Danish children's writer and biographer
Patricia Burke Brogan (1926–2022) , Ireland), pw. & poet
Suzanne Brøgger (b. 1944, Denmark), nv. & poet
Vera Broido (1907–2004, Soviet Union/England), social wr.
Anne Brontë (1820–1849, England), nv. & poet; The Tenant of Wildfell Hall
Charlotte Brontë (1816–1855, England), nv. & poet; Jane Eyre
Emily Brontë (1818–1848, England), nv. & poet; Wuthering Heights
Charlotte Brooke (c. 1740–1793, Ireland), translator from Irish
Emma Brooke (1844–1926, England), nv.
Frances Brooke (1723–1789, England), nv., es. & pw.
Iris Brooke (1905 – post-1967, England), non-f. wr. & illustrator
Susan Brookes (b. c. 1943/44),, England), non-f.
Anita Brookner (1928–2016, England), nv. & art historian
Geraldine Brooks (b. 1955, Australia/United States), nv.
Gwendolyn Brooks (1917–2000, United States), poet & wr.
Anne Brooksbank (b. 1943, Australia), scriptwriter & pw.
Mary Anne Broome, Lady Broome (1831–1911, Australia), nv., travel & ch. wr.
Nicole Brossard (b. 1943, Canada/Newfoundland), poet & nv.
Alice Williams Brotherton (1848–1930, United States), poet & wr.
Rhoda Broughton (1840–1920, Wales/England), nv.
Olga Broumas (b. 1949, Gk/United States), poet
Flora Brovina (b. 1949, Kosovo), poet & pediatrician
Irja Agnes Browallius (1901–1968, Finland/Sweden), fiction wr.
Babette Brown (1931–2019, South Africa/England), socio-political wr.
Cindy Lynn Brown (b. 1973, Denmark/United States), poet
Deidre Brown (b. 1970, New Zealand), art historian
Diane Brown (b. 1951, New Zealand), nv. & poet
Eva Maria Brown (1856–1917, United States), reformer, activist & legal wr.
Helen Brown (b. 1954, New Zealand/Australia), wr. & col.
Lily Brown (b. 1981, United States), poet & wr.
Helen Gurley Brown (1922–2012, United States), wr.
Margaret Wise Brown (1910–1952, United States), ch. wr.
Monica Brown (b. 1969, Peru/United States), ch. wr.
Pam Brown (b. 1948, Australia), poet & prose wr.
Pat Brown (b. 1955, United States), wr. on crime
Rebecca Brown (b. 1956, United States), wr.
Rita Mae Brown (b. 1944, United States), nv., poet & screenwriter
Riwia Brown (b. 1957, New Zealand), pw.
Audrey Brown-Pereira (b. 1975, New Zealand), poet & civil servant
Emma Alice Browne (1835–1890, United States), poet
Frances Browne (1816–1879, Ireland), poet & nv., ch. fiction wr.
Harriet Louisa Browne (1829–1906, Scotland/New Zealand), salonnière & correspondent
Mary Bonaventure Browne (post-1610 – post-1670, Ireland), abbess & historian
Elizabeth Barrett Browning (1806–1861, England), poet; Aurora Leigh
Josette Bruce (1920–1996, Poland/France), nv.
Mary Grant Bruce (1878–1958, Australia), ch. wr. & col.
Edith Bruck (b. 1932, Hungary/Italy), fiction wr. & pw. in Italian
Mary Brück (1925–2008, Ireland/Scotland), astronomer & science historian
Christine Brückner (1921–1996, Germany), fiction & ch. wr.
Máire MacSwiney Brugha (1918–2012, Ireland), poet & fiction wr.
Alyssa Brugman (b. 1974, Australia), YA wr.
Til Brugman (1888–1958, Netherlands), fiction wr. & poet
Eliane Brum (b. 1966, Brazil), current affairs wr.
Herminia Brumana (1897–1954, Argentina), nv. & pw.
Olga Broumas (b. 1949, Greece/United States), poet in English
Friederike Brun (1765–1835, Denmark), wr. & salonnière
Elisa Brune (1966–2018, Belgium), wr. in French
Marta Brunet (1897–1967, Chile), fiction wr.
Andrée Brunin (1937–1993, France), poet
Giuliana Bruno (living, England), environmentalist
Marianne Bruns (1897–1994, Georgia (Caucasus)), nv. & poet
Mary Brunton (1778–1818, Scotland), nv.
Sara Cone Bryant (1873–1956, United States), lecturer, teacher, wr.
Colette Bryce (b. 1970, Northern Ireland/England), poet
Jane Bryce (b. 1951, Tanzania/England), non-f. wr, critic, academic
Bryher (1894–1983, England), nv., poet & mem.
Annika Bryn (b. 1945, Sweden), fiction wr.
Anna Brzezińska (b. 1971, Poland), fiction wr.

Bu–By
Bu Feiyan (步非烟, b. 1981, China), wuxia nv.
Mary K. Buck (1849-1901, Bohemia/United States), wr.
Pearl S. Buck (1892–1973, United States), fiction wr. & biographer; 1938 Nobel Prize in Literature
Catherine Buckle (b. 1957, Zimbabwe), ch. wr.
Ann Buckley (living, Ireland), musicologist
Klara Buda (living, Albania/France), wr. & col.
Zsuzsanna Budapest (b. 1940, Hungary/United States), non-f. wr. in English
Mariam Budia (b. 1970, Sp.), pw. & academic
Maria Elizabeth Budden (c. 1780–1832, England), nv., translator & ch. wr.
Lukrecija Bogašinović Budmani (1710–1784, Dalmatia/Ragusa), poet
Andrea Hollander Budy (b. 1947, United States), poet
Aminta Buenaño (b. 1958, Ecuador), wr. & politician
Maritza M. Buendía (b. 1974, Mexico), social es.
Ken Bugul (b. 1947, Senegal), nv. in Wolof
Traude Bührmann (b. 1942, Germany), nv. & col.
Kanstantsia Builo (1893–1986, Soviet Union/Bulgaria), poet & pw.
Lela E. Buis, fiction, non-f. and poetry
Ada Buisson (1839–1866), nv. and writer of ghost stories 
Fanny Buitrago (living, Comoros), fiction wr. & pw.
NoViolet Bulawayo (b. 1981, Zimbabwe), fiction wr.
Emily Hemans Bulcock (1877–1969, Australia), poet
Fanny Mary Katherine Bulkeley-Owen (1845–1927, Wales), historian
Margaret Bullock (1845–1903, New Zealand), col. & nv.
Silvina Bullrich (1915–1990, Argentina), nv. & screenwriter
Anna Bülow (died 1519, Sweden), wr., translator & abbess
Selina Bunbury (1802–1882, Ireland), nv. & travel wr.
Delfina Bunge (1881–1952, Argentina), poet, fiction wr. & es.
Anna Bunina (1774–1829, Russia), poet
Sevim Burak (1931–1983, Turkey/Ottoman Empire), fiction wr. & pw.
Adda Burch (1869–1929, United States), non-f. wr., teacher, missionary & activist
Elizabeth Burchill (1904–2003, Australia), wr., nurse & philanthropist
Catherine Dorothea Burdett (1784–1861, Ireland), nv.
Carmen de Burgos (1867–1932, Spain), wr. & activist
Erika Burkart (1922–2010, Switzerland), poet & wr. in German
Anne Burke (fl. 1780–1805, Ireland), fiction wr.
Jan Burke (b. 1953, United States), nv. & short story wr.
Bonnie Burnard (1945–2017, Canada/Newfoundland), nv.
Frances Hodgson Burnett (1849–1924, England), pw. & ch. wr.
Caroline Burney (fl. early 19th century), nv.
Frances Burney (1776–1828, England), closet pw.
Frances Burney (1752–1840, England), nv., diarist & pw.
Sarah Burney (1772–1844, England), nv.
Clara Louise Burnham (1854–1827, United States), nv.
Andreas Burnier (1931–2002, Netherlands), poet & wr.
Anna Burns (b. 1962, Northern Ireland), nv.
Joanne Burns (b. 1945, Australia), art critic, historian & nv.
Deborah Burrows (b. 1959, Australia), nv.
Mary Towne Burt (1842–1898, United States), temperance reformer
Stephanie Burt (b. 1971, United States), poet & critic
Margaret Busby (b. 1944, Ghana/Gold Coast), publisher, critic & pw.
Penny Busetto (living, South Africa), nv. in English
Olivia Ward Bush (1869–1944, United States), wr., poet & col.
Abena Busia (b. 1953, Ghana/Gold Coast), poet & academic
Akosua Busia (b. 1966, Ghana/Gold Coast), actor, nv. & screenwriter
Helle Busacca (1915–1996, Italy), poet, wr. & painter
Christine Busta (1915–1987, Austria/Austria-Hungary), poet & ch. wr.
Hipatia Cárdenas de Bustamante (1889–1972, Ecuador), wr. & feminist
María Nieves y Bustamante (1871–1947, Peru), wr.
Gabriela Bustelo (b. 1962, Spain), nv. & political wr.
Fatimah Busu (b. 1943, Malaysia), fiction wr. & academic
Sharon Butala (b. 1940, Canada/Newfoundland), nv.
Amy Butcher (living, United States), es. & wr.
Ruby Bute (b. 1943, Aruba), fiction wr., poet & painter
Dorothy Butler (1925–2015, New Zealand), ch. wr. & mem.
Gwendoline Butler (also Jennie Melville; 1922–2013, England), nv.
Octavia Butler (1947–2006, United States), science fiction wr.
Susan Bulkeley Butler (living, United States), wr.
Urvashi Butalia (b. 1952, India), writer & activist
Julia Butschkow (b. 1978, Denmark), fiction wr. & poet
Miriam Butterworth (1918–2019, United States), pacifist & politician
Razia Butt (1924–2012, Pakistan), nv. & radio pw.
Mary Butts (1890–1937, England), modernist wr.
Rumena Bužarovska (b. 1981, Macedonia), wr.
A. S. Byatt (b. 1936, England), nv. & poet
Kim Byeol-ah (b. 1969, Korea), wr.
Marie Beuzeville Byles (1900–1979, Australia), travel & non-f. wr.
Maj Bylock (1931–2019, Sweden), ch. wr. & educator
Sarah Shun-lien Bynum (b. 1972, United States), fiction wr. & anthologist
Ethna Byrne-Costigan (1904–1991, Ireland), academic & wr.
Catherine Byron (b. 1947, England/Northern Ireland), poet
Cheryl Byron (c. 1947–2003, Trinidad), poet & singer

C

Ca–Ch
Fernán Caballero (1796–1877, Spain), nv.
Meg Cabot (b. 1967, United States), wr.
Astrid Cabral (b. 1936, Brazil), nv. & poet
Cristina Rodríguez Cabral (b. 1959, Uruguay), poet & researcher
Lydia Cabrera (1899–1991, Cuba), ethnographer
Aurora Cáceres (1877–1958, Peru), nv., es. & travel wr.
Esther de Cáceres (1903–1971, Uruguay), poet
Lydia Cacho (b. 1963, Mexico), social writer
Caroline Caddy (b. 1944, Australia), poet
Florence Caddy (1837–1923, England), wr.
Elizabeth Cadell (1903–1989, India/England), wr.
Dilys Cadwaladr (1902–1979, Wales), poet
Kathleen Caffyn (Iota, 1853–1926, Australia), nv.
Claude Cahun (1894–1954, France), wr. & photographer
Cai Yan (蔡琰, late 2nd–early 3rd centuries, China), poet & composer
Dominique Caillat (living, Switzerland/Germany), social wr.
Rachel Caine, pen name of Roxanne Longstreet Conrad (1962–2020, United States), nv.
Mona Caird (c. 1854–1932, Scotland), nv. & es.
Lutegarda Guimarães de Caires (1873–1935, Portugal), poet & activist
Susana Calandrelli (1901–1978, Argentina), poet, fiction wr. & es.
Graciela Rincón Calcaño (1904–1987, Venezuela), wr. & poet
Taylor Caldwell (1900–1985, England/United States), nv.
Hortense Calisher (1911–2009, United States), wr.
Margaret Callan (c.1817–c.1883), Ireland/Australia), poet
Maria Callcott (1785–1842, England), ch. & travel wr.
Nina de Callias (1843–1884, France), poet
Carmen Callil (1938–2022, Australia/UK), wr. & critic
June Callwood (1924–2007, Canada/Newfoundland), wr. & activist
Marie Calm (1832–1887, Germany), poet, nv. and household wr.
Mena Calthorpe (1905–1996, Australia), nv.
Paola Calvetti (b. 1948, Italy), nv. & col.
María Enriqueta Camarillo (1872–1968, Mexico), poet & fiction wr.
Ada Cambridge (1844–1926, Australia), nv., poet & autobiographer
Joan Cambridge (living, Guyana), nv. & journalist
María Cambrils (1878–1939, Spain), feminist wr.
Charlotte Cameron (c. 1872–1946, United States), travel writer
Margaret Cameron (1867–1947, United States), nv., pw., & non-f. wr.
Duccia Camiciotti (1928–2014, Italy), poet and es.
Roser Caminals-Heath (living, Spain), nv. in Catalan
Kate Camp (b. 1972, New Zealand), poet
Manuela Campanelli (b. 1962, Italy), science wr.
Bebe Moore Campbell (1950–2006, United States), nv.
Bonnie Jo Campbell (b. 1962, United States), fiction wr.
Hazel Campbell (1940–2018, Jamaica), fiction & ch. wr.
Shirley Campbell (b. 1965, Costa Rica), poet
Lady Colin Campbell (b. 1949, Jamaica/England), biographer
Marion May Campbell (b. 1948, Australia), nv. & academic
Meg Campbell (1937–2007, New Zealand), poet
Nellie Campobello (1900–1986, Mexico), poet & chronicler
Ana Barrios Camponovo (b. 1961, Uruguay/Spain), wr. & illustrator
Julieta Campos (1932–2007, Cuba/Mexico), nv.
María Teresa Campos (b. 1941, Spain), non-f. wr.
Zenobia Camprubí (1887–1956, Spain/United States), wr & poet
Matilde Camus (1919–2012, Spain), poet & non-f. wr.
Lorea Canales (living, Mexico), nv. & lawyer
Amélie-Julie Candeille (1667–1734, France), librettist & composer
Eva Canel (1857–1932, Spain/Cuba), nv. & satirist
Marta Canessa (b. 1936, Uruguay), historian & academic
Yanitzia Canetti (b. 1967, Cuba/United States), nv., es. & ch. wr.
Dorothy Canfield (1879–1958, United States), wr.; Understood Betsy
May Wedderburn Cannan (1893–1973, England), poet
Moya Cannon (b. 1956, Ireland), poet
Minna Canth (1844–1897, Finland), wr. & activist
Estela Canto (1919–1994, Argentina), nv., biographer & translator
Ludmilla Lacueva Canut (b. 1971, Andorra), fiction & non-f. wr.
Lan Cao (b. 1961, Vietnam/United States), wr.
Úna-Minh Caomhánach (b. 1991, Ireland), travel & social wr.
Vahni Capildeo (b. 1973, Trinidad/Scotland), poet
Maria Aurèlia Capmany (1918–1991, Spain), nv. & pw.
Jeanne Cappe (1895–1956, Belgium), YA wr. in French
Margarita Abella Caprile (1901–1960, Argentina), poet & fiction & travel wr.
Paola Capriolo (b. 1962, Italy), nv.
Marcelle Capy (1891–1962, France), nv. & feminist
Ethna Carbery (1864–1902, Ireland), wr. & poet
Teresa Gisbert Carbonell (1926–2018, Bolivia), art historian
Mercedes Cabello de Carbonera (1845–1909, Peru), nv. & es.
Hazel V. Carby (b. 1946, England/United States), academic & non-f. wr.
Lara Cardella (b. 1969, Italy), nv.
Nancy Cárdenas (1934–1994, Mexico), poet & pw.
Amélia dos Santos Costa Cardia (1855–1938, Portugal), nv. & physician
Marie Cardinal (1929–2001, Algeria/France), nv.
Dulce Maria Cardoso (b. 1964, Portugal), fiction wr.
Jacqueline Carey (b. 1964, United States), nv.
Rosa Nouchette Carey (1840–1909, England), nv. & ch. wr.
Mary Jane Goodson Carlisle (1835–1905, United States), cookbook wr.
Patricia Carlon (1927–2002), nv.
Gunnel Carlson (b. 1956, Sweden), gardening wr.
Kristina Carlson (b. 1949, Finland), fiction & YA wr. & poet
Gladys Carmagnola (1939–2015, Paraguay), poet & ch. wr.
Amy Carmichael (1867–1951, Ireland/India), wr. & missionary
Jennings Carmichael (1868–1904, Australia), poet
María Luisa Carnelli (1898–1987, Argentina), poet & col.
Ethel Carnie Holdsworth (1886–1962, England), wr. & socialist campaigner
Pauline Cassin Caro (1828/34/35 – 1901, France), nv.
Marina Carr (b. 1964, Ireland), pw.
Peggy Carr (b. c. 1955, Saint Vincent/Taiwan), poet & nv.
Maite Carranza (b. 1958, Spain), nv. & ch. wr.
Margarita Carrera (1929–2018, Guatemala), philosopher, poet and es.
Albertina Carri (b. 1973, Argentina), screenwriter & director
Leonora Carrington (1917–2011, England/Mexico), nv., artist & surrealist
Austin Carroll (1835–1909, Ireland/United States), religious wr. & nun
Claudia Carroll (b. c. 1969, Ireland), fiction wr. & actor
Anne Carson (b. 1950, Canada/Newfoundland), poet, ess., translator & academic
Rachel Carson (1907–1964, United States), marine biologist & conservationist
Esther Carstensen (1873–1955, Denmark), rights activist
Catherine Carswell (1879–1946, Scotland), wr.
Teresa de Cartagena (c. 1425–?, Spain), religious wr.
Aída Cartagena Portalatín (1918–1994), Dominican poet, fiction wr. & ess.
Angela Carter (1940–1992, England), nv. & col.
Anne Laurel Carter (b. 1953, Canada/Newfoundland), nv.
Elizabeth Carter (1717–1806, England), poet, wr. & Bluestocking
Emma de Cartosio (1928–2013, Argentina), wr. & poet
Candice Carty-Williams (b. 1989, England), nv. & col.
Maria Amália Vaz de Carvalho (1847–1921, Portugal), biographer, fiction wr. & poet
Maria Judite de Carvalho (1921–1998, Portugal), fiction wr. & poet
Caroline Carver (b. 1959, England/Australia), nv.
Lisa Crystal Carver (b. 1968, United States), wr.
Alice Cary (1820–1871, United States), poet
Elizabeth Cary (1585–1639, England), pw.
Phoebe Cary (1824–1871, United States), poet
Selva Casal (1930–2020, Uruguay), poet
Fina Casalderrey (b. 1951, Spain), ch. wr. & gastronomer in Galician
María Andrea Casamayor (1720–1780, Spain), wr. & mathematician
Sofía Casanova (1861–1958, Spain), poet & nv.
Borita Casas (1911–1999, Spain), pw. & ch. wr.
Matilde Casazola (b. 1942, Bolivia), poet & songwriter
Nené Cascallar (1914–1982, Argentina), broadcast pw. & screenwriter
Marietta Stanley Case (1845–1900, United States), poet
Maxine Case (b. 1976, South Africa), fiction wr. in English
Adelaide Casely-Hayford (1868–1960, Sierra Leone), fiction wr. & educator
Gladys May Casely-Hayford (1901–1950, Sierra Leone), poet
Anne-Marie Casey (b. 1965, Ireland), screenwriter & nv.
Kathryn Casey (living, United States), true crime wr. & nv.
Maie Casey, Baroness Casey (1910–1983, Australia), poet, librettist & biographer
Deirdre Cash (1924–1963, Australia), nv.
Kristin Cashore (b. 1976, United States), fantasy wr.
Linda Ty Casper (b. 1931, Philippines), nv.
Nina Cassian (1924–2014, Romania/United States), poet, ch. wr. & critic
P. C. Cast (b. 1960, United States), wr.
Cecilia Castaño (b. 1953, Spain), political scientist
Yolanda Castaño (b. 1977, Spain), poet, critic & painter
Sofía Castañón (b. 1983, Spain), poet
Adela Castell (1864–1926, Uruguay), es. & poet
Rosario Castellanos (1925–1974, Mexico), poet & wr.
Blanca Castellón (b. 1958, Nicaragua), poet
Castelloza (fl. early 13th century, France), troubadour poet
Josefina Castellví (b. 1935, Spain), oceanographer & biologist
Almucs de Castelnau (c. 1140 – pre–1184, France), poet in Occitan
Gladys Castelvecchi (1922–2008, Uruguay), poet & academic
Ana Castillo (b. 1953, Mx/United States), fiction wr., poet & es.
Claire Castillon (b. 1975, France), fiction & ch. wr.
Agnes Castle (c. 1860–1922, Ireland), fiction wr.
Elisabeth Castonier (1894–1975, Germany), ch. wr. in German & English
Inga-Brita Castrén (1919–2003, Finland), theologian
Luisa Castro (b. 1966, Spain), poet & fiction wr.
Públia Hortênsia de Castro (1548–1595, Portugal), scholar & nun
Rosalía de Castro (1837–1885, Spain), wr. & poet in Galician
Willa Cather (1873–1947, United States), wr.
Catherine of Siena (1347–1380, Italy), religious writer & saint
Christine Cole Catley (1922–2011, New Zealand), col. & biographer
Nancy Cato (1917–2000, Australia), nv., poet & biographer
Eleanor Catton (b. 1985, Canada/Newfoundland/New Zealand), nv.
Joyce Cavalccante (living, Brazil), fiction wr.
Nadia Cavalera (b. 1950, Italy), nv., poet & critic
Jeanne de Cavally (1926–1992, Ivory Coast), ch. wr.
Jane Cavendish (1620/1621–1669, England), poet & pw.
Margaret Cavendish (1623–1673, England), poet, pw. & fiction wr.
Hannah Rebecca Frances Caverhill (1834–1897, England/New Zealand), diarist & homemaker
Rosina Cazali (b. 1960, Guatemala), art critic
Anne-Marie Cazalis (1920–1988, France), poet & col.
Otilia Cazimir (1894–1967, Romania), poet & prose wr.
Mercedes Cebrián (b. 1971, Spain), fiction wr. & poet
Martha Cecilia (b. 1953, Philippines), nv.
Siv Cedering (1939–2007, Sweden/United States), poet & fiction wr. in Swedish & English
Peride Celal (1916–2013, Turkey/Ottoman Empire), fiction wr.
Susannah Centlivre (1667–1723, England), pw. & poet
Natividad Cepeda (living, Spain), poet & col.
Laura Cereta (1469–1499, Italy), humanist
Anica Černej (1900–1944, Austria/Austria-Hungary/Yugoslavia), wr., poet & concentration camp victim
Laura Sintija Černiauskaitė (b. 1976, Lithuania), pw. & nv.
Annabel Cervantes (b. 1969, Spain), geographer in Catalan
Marie Červinková-Riegrová (1854–1895, Austria/Austria-Hungary), librettist
Isabella Cervoni (1575–1600, Italy), poet
Ruxandra Cesereanu (b. 1963, Romania), poet, fiction wr. & critic
Alba de Céspedes (1911–1997, Cuba/Italy), nv.
Úrsula Céspedes (1832–1874, Cuba), wr. & educator
Ana Cristina Cesar (1952–1983, Brazil), poet & critic
Fethiye Çetin (b. 1950, Turkey/Ottoman Empire), political biographer
Violante do Céu (fl. 17th century, Portugal), poet
Margaret Cezair-Thompson (living, Jamaica), fiction wr. & screenwriter
Theresa Hak Kyung Cha (1951–1982, United States), nv. & artist
Dulce Chacón (1954–2003, Spain), poet, nv. & pw.
Zofia Chądzyńska (1912–2003, Poland), nv.
Nadia Chafik (b. 1962, Morocco), fiction wr. in French
Arlene J. Chai (b. 1955, Philippines/Australia), nv.
Brenda Chamberlain (1912–1971, Wales), poet, nv. & artist
Anne Chambers (living, Ireland), biographer, nv. & screenwriter
Kátya Chamma (b. 1961, Brazil), poet & wr.
Tracy Chamoun (b. 1960, Lebanon), political wr. & diplomat
Élise Champagne (1897–1983, Belgium), educator & wr. in French
Ernestina de Champourcín (1905–1999, Spain), poet
Françoise Chandernagor (b. 1945, France), nv. & pw.
Elizabeth Margaret Chandler (1807–1834, United States), poet & wr.
Lynda Chanwai-Earle (living, Papua New Guinea/New Zealand), pw., poet & scriptwriter
Hester Chapone (1827–1901, England), wr. of conduct books
Corinne Chaponnière (b. 1954, Switzerland/Canada/Newfoundland), social wr. & biographer in French
Isabelle de Charrière (1740–1805, Netherlands/France), fiction wr. & correspondent in French
Raquel Chaves (b. 1939, Paraguay), poet & nv.
Daína Chaviano (b. 1957, Cuba/United States), science fiction wr.
Neelam Saxena Chandra (b. 1969, India), poet & ch. wr.
Chandramathi (b. 1954, India), fiction wr. & critic
Chang Ch'ung-ho (張充和, 1914–2015, China/United States), poet & singer
Diana Chang (1934–2009, China/United States), nv. & poet
Eileen Chang (张爱玲, 1920–1995, China/United States), es., nv. & screenwriter
Jung Chang (b. 1952, China/United States), wr.; Wild Swans
Zeenat Abdullah Channa (1919–1974, India/Pakistan), wr. & educationist
Lynda Chanwai-Earle (living, Papua New Guinea/New Zealand), pw., poet & scriptwriter
Hester Chapone (1727–1801, England), wr. & Bluestocking
Madeleine Chapsal (b. 1925, France), nv., es. & ch. wr.
Charlotte Charke (1713–1760, England), pw., nv. & autobiographer
Edmonde Charles-Roux (1920–2016, France), nv. & col.
Elizabeth Charlotte, Princess Palatine (1652–1722, Germany), correspondent
Maureen Charlton (1930–2007, Ireland), pw. & poet
Janet Charman (b. 1954, New Zealand), poet
Isabelle de Charrière (1740–1805, Netherlands), nv. in French
Lidia Charskaya (1875–1938, Russia), nv.
Victorine Chastenay (1771–1855), wr. & mem.
Noëlle Châtelet (b. 1944, France), es. & fiction wr.
Rimi B. Chatterjee (b. 1969, India), nv. & historian
Georgiana Chatterton (1806–1876, England), wr. & traveler
Beth Chatto (1923–2018, England), garden wr.
Jayasri Chattopadhyay (b. 1945, India), poet & academic
Anuja Chauhan (b. 1970, India), nv. & screenwriter
Subhadra Kumari Chauhan (1904–1948, India), poet & Hindi songwriter
Nan Chauncy (1900–1970, Australia), ch. wr.
Susana Chávez (1974–2011, Mexico), poet & activist
Daína Chaviano (b. 1960, Curaçao), wr.
Chantal Chawaf (b. 1943, France), social wr.
Dniprova Chayka (1861–1927, Russia/Ukraine), poet & fiction wr.
Charlotte Saumaise de Chazan (1619–1684, France), poet
Mavis Cheek (b. c. 1948, England), nv.
Isabel Cheix (1839–1899, Spain), nv., poet & pw.
Olena Chekan (1946–2013, Ukraine), screenwriter & actor
Saveria Chemotti (b. 1947, Italy), non-f., es. & nv.
Chen Danyan (陈丹燕, b. 1958, China), biographer
Chen Jingrong (陳敬容, 1917–1989, China), poet
Chen Xuezhao (陈学昭, 1906–1991, China), es. & col.
Ying Chen (应晨, b. 1961, China/Canada/Newfoundland), wr.
Aïcha Chenna (1941–2022, Morocco), social wr. & activist
Cheon Un-yeong (천운영, b. 1971, Korea), fiction wr.
Svetlana Chervonnaya (b. 1948, Soviet Union/Russia), political historian
Élisabeth Sophie Chéron (1648–1711, France), poet, painter & musician
Kelly Cherry (1940–2022, United States), nv., poet & es.
C. J. Cherryh (b. 1942, United States), science fiction & fantasy wr.
Anna Maria Chetwode (fl. 1827, Ireland), nv.
Angelica Cheung (张宇, China), fashion wr. & editor
Tracy Chevalier (b. 1962, United States/England), nv.; Girl with a Pearl Earring
Corinne Chevallier (b. 1935, Algeria), nv. & historian
Helmina von Chézy (1783–1856, Germany), poet, pw. and col.
Catherine Chidgey (b. 1970, New Zealand), fiction wr.
Panashe Chigumadzi (b. 1991, Zimbabwe), col., es. & nv.
Sagawa Chika (左川ちか,1911–1936, Japan), poet
Lydia Maria Child (1802–1880, United States), poet & nv.
Alice Childress (1916–1994, United States), pw. & nv.
Cecile Cilliers (1933–2018, South Africa), es. in Afrikaans
Irma Chilton (1930–1990, Wales), ch. wr.
Mei Chin (b. 1977, United States), wr. & food critic
Luz Argentina Chiriboga (b. 1940, Ecuador), fiction wr.
Toriko Chiya (稚野鳥子, living, Japan), manga creator
Fukuda Chiyo-ni (福田千代尼, 1703–1775, Japan), haiku poet
Paulina Chiziane (b. 1955, Mozambique), fiction wr.
Youmna Chlala (living, Lebanon/United States), political wr. & artist
Joanna Chmielewska (1932–2013, Poland), nv. & screenwriter
Zen Cho (b. 1986, Malaysia/England), fiction wr.
Sonia Chocrón (b. 1961, Venezuela), poet, nv. & pw.
Kunzang Choden (b. 1952, Bhutan), nv.
Pema Chödrön (b. 1936, United States), Buddhist wr.
Choe Yun (최윤, b. 1953, Korea), fiction wr.
Choi Jeong-rye (최정례, 1955–2021, Korea), poet
Susan Choi (b. 1969, United States), nv. & editor
Maryse Choisy (1903–1979, France), philosophical wr. & nv.
Mary Cholmondeley (1859–1925, England), nv.
Lathóg of Tír Chonaill (fl. 9th century, Ireland), poet
Denise Chong (b. 1953, Canada/Newfoundland), mem. & non-f. wr.
Kate Chopin (1851–1904, United States), fiction wr.
Lynda Chouiten (living, Algeria), non-f. wr.
Prem Chowdhry (b. 1944, India), social scientist
Rita Chowdhury (b. 1960, India), poet & nv.
Helene Christaller (1872–1953, Germany), ch. nv.
Linda Christanty (b. 1970, Indonesia), fiction wr. & es.
Ada Christen (1839–1901, Austria/Austria-Hungary), poet & fiction wr.
Inger Christensen (1935–2009, Denmark), poet & prose wr.
Kate Christensen (b. 1962, United States), nv.
Autumn Christian (living, United States), horror & science fiction wr.
Yvette Christiansë (b. 1954, South Africa/United States), poet & nv. in English
Agatha Christie (1890–1976, England), crime wr. & pw.; The Mousetrap
Elizabeth Christitch (1861–1933, Ireland/Serbia), wr., poet & translator
Nanae Chrono (黒乃奈々絵, b. 1980, Japan), manga creator
Chrystos (b. 1946, United States), Menominee rights activist & poet
Daria Chubata (b. 1940, Ukraine), physician, wr., poet
R. Chudamani (1931–2010, India), fiction wr.
Elena Chudinova (b. 1959, Soviet Union/Russia), nv. & non-f. wr.
Lady Mary Chudleigh (1656–1710, England), poet, es. & wr.
Leila Chudori (b. 1962, Indonesia), fiction & ch. wr. & screenwriter
Rain Chudori (b. 1994, Indonesia), fiction wr. & screenwriter
Ismat Chughtai (1915–1991, India), wr.
Lydia Chukovskaya (1907–1996, Soviet Union), political wr. & poet
Eugenia Chuprina (b. 1971, Ukraine), poet, wr., nv., & pw.
Caryl Churchill (b. 1938, England), pw.
Sarah Churchwell (b. 1977, United States), academic
Sylwia Chutnik (b. 1979, Poland), nv. & activist

Ci–Co
Fausta Cialente (1898–1994, Italy), nv. & activist
Maria Luisa Cicci (1760–1794, Italy), woman of letters & poet
Muazzez İlmiye Çığ (b. 1914, Turkey/Ottoman Empire), archaeologist
Birutė Ciplijauskaitė (1929–2017, Lithuania/United States), linguist & critic
Zehra Çırak (b. 1960, Turkey/Ottoman Empire/Germany), fiction wr. in German
Victoria Cirlot (b. 1955, Spain), medievalist
Sandra Cisneros (b. 1954, United States), fiction wr.
Aïssatou Cissé (b. 1970/1971, Senegal), nv.
Lana Citron (b. 1969, Ireland/England), fiction wr, screenwriter & poet
Nuriye Ulviye Mevlan Civelek (1893–1964, Turkey/Ottoman Empire), political wr.
Gabrielle Civil (living, United States), performance artist, poet, & educator
Hélène Cixous (b. 1937 Algeria/France), poet, pw. & philosopher
Ellen Clacy (1830–1901, Australia), nv. & non-f. wr.
Nadezhda Bravo Cladera (living, Bolivia/Sweden), linguist & researcher
Daphne Clair (b. 1939, New Zealand), nv. & poet
Paula Clamp (b. 1967, England), nv. & pw.
Amy Clampitt (1920–1994, United States), poet & wr.
Fanny Clar (1875-1944, France), journalist & wr.
Cassandra Clare (b. 1973, United States), young-adult fiction wr.
Monica Clare (1924–1973, Australia), nv.
Clarinda (fl. early 17th century, Peru), poet
Harriet E. Clark (1850-1945, US), teacher & wr.
Mavis Thorpe Clark (1909–1999, Australia), non-f. & ch. wr.
Sue Cassidy Clark (living, United States), music col. & photographer
Joan Clark (b. 1934, Canada/Newfoundland), nv.
Margaret Clark (b. 1964, United States), historian, wr. & educator
Mary Higgins Clark (1927–2020), United States), nv.
Amy Key Clarke (1892–1980, England), mystical poet, wr. & teacher
Anna Clarke (1919–2004, England), mystery wr.
Jennie Thornley Clarke (1860-1924, United States), educator, wr., & anthologist
Josephine Fitzgerald Clarke (1865–1953, Ireland), nv.
Maxine Beneba Clarke (living, Australia), wr.
Breena Clarke (living, United States), scholar & wr. of fiction
Cheryl Clarke (b. 1947, United States), poet, es. & activist
Coralie Clarke (Coralie Clarke Rees, 1908–1972, Australia), travel wr.
Gillian Clarke (b. 1937, Wales), poet, pw. & broadcaster
Mrs. Henry Clarke (1853–1908, England), fiction & ch. wr.
Mary H. Gray Clarke (1835–1992, United States), wr., correspondent & poet
Maude Clarke (1892–1935, Northern Ireland/England), historian
Susanna Clarke (b. 1959, England), nv.
Patricia Clapp (1912–2003, United States), ch. wr.
Margareta Clausdotter (died 1486, Sweden), wr. & abbess
Ana Clavel (b. 1961, Mexico), fiction wr.
Beverly Cleary (1916–2021, United States), ch. wr.
Kate McPhelim Cleary (1863–1905, United States), fiction wr.
Joceline Clemencia (1952–2011, Curaçao), wr. & linguist
Catherine Clément (b. 1939, France), philosopher, nv. & critic
Inga Clendinnen (1934–2016, Australia), wr. & historian
Cleobulina (fl. c. 550 BC, Ancient Greece), poet
Agnes Mary Clerke (1942–2007, Ireland), astronomer
Claude Catherine de Clermont (1543–1603, France), scholar & courtier
Michelle Cliff (1946–2016, Jamaica/United States), fiction wr., poet & critic
Charmian Clift (1923–1969, Australia), nv. & non-f. wr.
Lucille Clifton (1936–2010, United States), poet, wr. & educator
Gloria Griffen Cline (1929–1973, United States), historian
Michelle T. Clinton (b. 1955, United States), poet.
Caroline Clive (1801–1872, England), poet & nv.
Kitty Clive (1711–1785, England), actor & pw.
Bente Clod (b. 1946, Denmark), poet & prose wr.
Amal Clooney (b. 1978, Lebanon/England), legal & political wr.
Marie Closset (Jean Dominique, 1873–1952, Belgium), poet in French
Anne Cluysenaar (1936–2014, Belgium/Ireland), poet & wr. in English
Hafina Clwyd (1936–2011, Wales), es. & educator
Constance Clyde (1872–1951, New Zealand/Australia), nv. & political wr.
Ella Maria Dietz Clymer (1847–1920, United States), poet & actor
Nellie Euphemia Coad (1883–1974, New Zealand/England), textbook wr.
Lynn Coady (b. 1970, Canada/Newfoundland), fiction wr. & col.
Wendy Coakley-Thompson (b. 1966, United States), nv.
Florence Earle Coates (1850–1927, United States), poet
Carola Cobo (1909–2003, Bolivia), cookery wr.
Eliza Dorothea Cobbe, Lady Tuite (c. 1764–1850, Ireland/England), poet
Frances Power Cobbe (1822–1904, Ireland), wr. & suffragist
Sofia Cocea (1839–1861, Romania), es. & poet
Sarah Johnson Cocke (1865-1944, United States), wr. & mem.
Patricia Cockburn (1914–1989, Ireland/England), writer & conchologist
Grace Coddington (b. 1941, Wales), fashion wr. & mem.
Mariana Codruț (b. 1956, Romania), poet, es. & fiction wr.
Alice Rollit Coe (1858–1940, Canada/Newfoundland/United States), wr.
Mariana Coelho (1857–1954, Portugal/Brazil), poet & es.
Sara Pinto Coelho (1913–1990, Portugal), radio pw. & fiction & ch. wr.
Ana Cofiño (b. 1955, Guatemala), anthropologist & historian
Yolande Cohen (b. 1950, Morocco/Canada) historian & professor
Gabrielle de Coignard (1550–1586, France), religious poet
Virginia Coigney (1917–1997, United States), civic leader & wr.
Allison Hedge Coke (b. 1958, United States), poet & wr.
Marina Colasanti (b. 1937, Eritrea/Brazil), wr. & poet
Frona Eunice Wait Colburn (1859–1946, United States), col. & fiction wr.
H. Maria George Colby (1844–1910, United States), col. & suffragist
Emma Shaw Colcleugh (1846–1940, United States), col., lecturer & traveler
Joanna Cole (1944–2020, United States), ch. wr.
Lois Dwight Cole (1903–1979, United States), editor & ch. wr.
Norma Cole (b. 1945, United States), poet, artist & translator
Alice Blanchard Coleman (1858-1936, United States), nf. wr.
Wanda Coleman (1946–2013, United States), poet
Elizabeth Fairburn Colenso (1821–1904, New Zealand), Bible translator & missionary
Christabel Rose Coleridge (1843–1921, England), nv. & editor
Mary Elizabeth Coleridge (1861–1907, England), nv. & poet
Sara Coleridge (1802–1852, England), wr. & translator
Louise Colet (1910–1976, France), poet & wr.
Colette (1873–1954, France), nv.; Gigi
Isabel Colegate (1931–2023, England), nv.
Marcia Collazo (b. 1959, Uruguay), poet & fiction wr.
Lindsey Collen (b. 1948, South Africa/Mauritius), wr. in English & Creole
Camilla Collett (1813–1895, Norway), nv., critic & es.
Anne-Hyacinthe de Colleville (1761–1824, France), nv. & pw.
Ada Langworthy Collier (1843–1919, United States), poet & wr.
Catrin Collier (b. 1948, England), nv. & pw.
Jennie Collins (1828–1887, United States), activist & wr.
Mabel Collins (1851–1927, England), theosophist
Merle Collins (b. 1950, Grenada), poet & fiction wr.
Suzanne Collins (b. 1962, United States), nv.
Danielle Collobert (1940–1978, France), fiction wr. & poet
Joséphine Colomb (1833-1892, France), children's wr., lyricist & translator
Vittoria Colonna (1490–1547, Italy), poet
Mary Colum (1884–1957, Ireland/United States), critic & wr.
Mercedes Comaposada (1901–1994, Spain), non-f. wr.
Sigrid Combüchen (b. 1942, Sweden), nv. & critic
Cristina Comencini (b. 1956, Italy), screenwriter & nv.
Anna Manning Comfort (1845-1931, United States), fiction and non-f. wr.
Flavia Company (b. 1963, Argentina), nv. & poet
Mercè Company (b. 1947, Spain), ch. wr. in Catalan
Anne Compton (b. 1947, Canada/Newfoundland), poet, critic & anthologist
Jennifer Compton (b. 1949, New Zealand/Australia), poet & pw.
Ivy Compton-Burnett (1884–1969, England), nv.
Helen Field Comstock (1840–1930, United States), poet, philanthropist
Helena Concannon (1878–1952, Ireland), historian & politician
Francisca Josefa de la Concepción (1661–1742, Comoros), nun & mystic
Nieves Concostrina (b. 1961, Spain), history wr.
Carmen Conde (1907–1996, Spain), poet & nv.
Maryse Condé (b. 1937, Guadeloupe/France), nv.
Rosina Conde (b. 1954, Mexico), narrator, pw. & poet
Teresa del Conde (1935–2017, Mexico), critic & art historian
Helen Gray Cone (1859–1934, United States), poet & professor
Sandra Coney (b. 1944, New Zealand), historian & health campaigner
Jane Elizabeth Dexter Conklin (1831–1914, United States), poet & religious wr.
Evelyn Conlon (b. 1952, Ireland), fiction wr. & es.
Marita Conlon-McKenna (b. 1956, Ireland), fiction and ch. wr.
Eliza Archard Conner (1838–1912, United States), lecturer & feminist
Elizabeth Marney Conner (1856–1941, United States), pw., educator & wr.
Susan E. Connolly (b. c. 1980, Ireland), fiction & non-f. wr.
June Considine (living, Ireland), ch. wr.
Lena Constante (1909–2005, Romania), es., mem. & artist
Josefina Constantino (b. 1920, Philippines/Australia), es., critic & poet
Ana Conta-Kernbach (1865–1921, Romania), wr. & educator
Dorothea Conyers (1869–1949, Ireland), nv.
Diane Cook (living, United States), fiction wr.
Eliza Cook (1818–1889, England), poet
Selma Cook (b. 1961, England), editor
Kay McKenzie Cooke (b. 1953, New Zealand), poet
Marvel Cooke (1903–2000, United States), col. & wr.
Elizabeth Cook-Lynn (b. 1930, United States), Sioux poet, nv. & academic
Ina Coolbrith (b. Josephine Anna Smith, 1841–1928, United States), poet
Deborah Coonts (living, United States), nv. & lawyer
Carolyn Cooper (b. 1950, Jamaica), wr. & critic
J. California Cooper (1931–2014, United States), pw. & fiction wr.
Wendy Cope (b. 1945, England), poet
Esther Copley (1786–1851, England), religious & ch. wr.
Marguerite Coppin (1867–1931, Belgium), poet & nv. in French
Cora Coralina (1889–1985, Brazil), wr. & poet
Judy Corbalis (living, New Zealand/England), fiction wr.
Helena Corbellini (b. 1959, Uruguay), fiction wr. & poet
Gilda Cordero-Fernando (1932–2020, Philippines), fiction & food wr.
Leonor López de Córdoba (1362/1363–1430, Spain), mem.
Marie Corelli (1855–1924, England), nv.
Corinna (Κόριννα, 6th century BC, Ancient Greece), poet
Cornificia (c. 85–c. 40 BC, Ancient Rome), poet & epigram wr.
Caroline Cornwallis (1786–1858, England), wr. on education, philosophy & science
Jane Cornwallis (1581–1659, England), correspondent
Anita Cornwell (b. 1923, United States), wr.
Patricia Cornwell (b. 1956, United States), crime wr.
Carolina Coronado (1820–1911, Spain), poet, nv. & pw.
Domitila García de Coronado (1847–1938, Cuba), biographer & anthologist
Celia Correas de Zapata (1933–2022, Argentina), poet & academic
Hélia Correia (b. 1949, Portugal), nv., pw. & poet
Natália Correia (1923–1993, Portugal), poet & activist
Cecilia K Corrigan (b. 1987, United States), poet & wr.
Sarah Cortez (living, United States), poet, editor & es.
Jayne Cortez (1936–2012, United States), poet & artist
Maria Corti (1915–2002, Italy), philologist, critic & nv.
Mary Corylé (1894–1976, Ecuador), wr. & poet
Giselle Cossard (1923–2016, Morocco/Brazil), anthropologist
Alicia Yánez Cossío (b. 1928, Ecuador), poet & nv.
Lola Costa (1903–2004, England), painter, wr. & poet
Margherita Costa (c. 1600 – post-1657, Italy), poet & pw.
Maria Velho da Costa (1938–2020, Portugal), wr.
Mary Costello (living, Ireland), fiction wr.
Saskia De Coster (b. 1976, Belgium), wr. in Flemish
Sophie Ristaud Cottin (1770–1807, France), nv.
Dorothy Cottrell (1902–1957, Australia), nv.
Violet May Cottrell (1887–1971, New Zealand), wr., poet & spiritualist
Anna Couani (b. 1948), nv., poet & artist
Micheline Coulibaly (1950–2003, Ivory Coast/Mexico), fiction & ch. wr.
Emily Coungeau (1860–1936, Australia), poet
Ajeet Cour (b. 1934, India), nv. & social wr.
Hedwig Courths-Mahler (1867–1950, Germany), nv.
Joanna Courtmans (1811–1890, Belgium), poet & prose wr. in Flemish
Arlette Cousture (b. 1948, Canada/Newfoundland), wr.
Sonia Coutinho (1939–2013, Brazil), fiction wr.
Dani Couture (b. 1978, Canada/Newfoundland), poet & nv.
Jessie Couvreur (1848–1897, Australia), nv.
Jeni Couzyn (b. 1942, South Africa/Canada/Newfoundland), poet & ch. wr. in English
Hannah Cowley (1743–1809, England), pw. & poet
Joy Cowley (b. 1936, New Zealand), nv. & ch. wr.
Roz Cowman (b. 1942, Ireland), poet & critic
Josephine Cox (1938–2020, England), nv.
Martine Le Coz (b. 1955, France), nv.

Cr–Cz
Ioana Crăciunescu (b. 1950, Romania), poet & actor
Fanny Cradock (1909–1994, England), cookery wr.
Sara Jane Crafts (1845–1930, United States), non-f. wr.
Christine Craig (b. 1943, Jamaica/United States), ch. wr. & poet
Mary Craig (1928–2019, England), journalist & wr.
Mary Lynde Craig (1834–1921, United States), wr., teacher & activist
Nicole Craig (b. 1974, Trinidad), poet & fiction wr.
Dinah Mulock Craik (1826–1887, England), nv.
Helen Craik (1751–1825, Scotland), nv.
Harriet L. Cramer (1847-1922, United States), editor, publisher
Hazel Crane (1951–2003, Ireland/South Africa), mem.
Nathalia Crane (1913–1998, United States), poet & nv.
Sibylla Bailey Crane (1851-1902, United States), educator, composer, non-f. wr.
Elizabeth Azcona Cranwell (1933–2004), poet & fiction wr.
Margaret Craven (1901–1980, United States), nv.
Pauline Marie Armande Craven (1808–1891, France), wr. & autobiographer
Rachael Craw (living, New Zealand), nv. & YA wr.
Emily Crawford (1841–1915, Ireland/France), col. & biographer
Isabella Valancy Crawford (1850–1887, Canada/Newfoundland), poet
Mabel Sharman Crawford (1820–1912, Ireland), travel wr.
Susan P. Crawford (b. 1963, United States), law professor
Máirín Cregan (1891–1975, Ireland), pw., nv. & ch. wr.
Jane Tapsubei Creider (b. 1940s, Kenya), autobiographer, nv, fiction and non-f. wr
Hélisenne de Crenne (c. 1510–1552, France), nv. & correspondent
Jasmine Cresswell (b. 1941, Wales), nv.
Julia Pleasants Creswell (1827–1886, United States), poet, nv
Alice Guerin Crist (1876–1941, Australia), poet, fiction wr. & col.
Ann Batten Cristall (1769–1848, England), poet
Maria Sonia Cristoff (b. 1965, Argentina), fiction & non-f. wr.
Alison Croggon (b. 1962, Argentina), poet, pw. & nv.
Bithia Mary Croker (1849–1920, Ireland/India), travel wr.
May Crommelin (1850–1930, Ireland/England), nv. & travel wr.
M. T. C. Cronin (b. 1963, Australia), wr.
Judy Croome (b. 1958, Zimbabwe/South Africa), fiction wr. & poet
Camilla Dufour Crosland (1812–1895, England), wr. & poet
Elsa Cross (b. 1946, Mexico), poet & es.
Fiona Cross (living, New Zealand), arachnologist
Zora Cross (1890–1964, Australia), poet & prose wr.
Sarah Crossan (living, Ireland), YA wr.
Julia Crottie (1853 – c. 1930, Ireland/United States), nv.
Karen Crouse (living, United States), wr.
Alev Croutier (b. 1954, Turkey/Ottoman Empire/United States), non-f. wr.
Catherine Crowe (1800–1876, England), pw., nv. & ch. book wr.
Helen Cruickshank (1886–1975, Scotland), poet in Braid Scots & English
Coralie van den Cruyce (1796–1858, Belgium), pw. in French
Aixa de la Cruz (b. 1988, Spain), fiction wr.
Conchitina Cruz (living, Philippines), poet & academic
Juana Inés de la Cruz (1651–1695, Mexico), poet, pw. and nun
Gabriella Csire (b. 1938, Romania), ch. wr. in Hungarian
Cristina Fernández Cubas (b. 1945, Spain), fiction wr.
María Guadalupe Cuenca (1790-1854, Bolivia), letter writer
Mireya Cueto (1922–2013, Mexico), wr. & puppeteer
Briceida Cuevas (b. 1969, Mexico), poet in Mayan
Anne Virginia Culbertson (1857-1918, United States), poet, wr.
Belle Caldwell Culbertson (1857–1934, United States), non.f. wr.
Diana Çuli (b. 1951, Albania), wr. & politician
Catherine Ann Cullen (living, Ireland), poet
Majella Cullinane (living, Ireland/New Zealand), nv. & poet
Meta Davis Cumberbatch (1900–1978, Trinidad/Bahamas), poet, pw. & activist
Jackie Cumming (living, New Zealand), health-care wr. & academic
Alissandra Cummins (b. 1958, Barbados), non-f. wr.
Geraldine Cummins (1890–1969, Ireland), spiritualist, nv. & pw.
Maria Susanna Cummins (1827–1866, United States), nv.
Anne Cuneo (1936–2015, Switzerland), nv. in French
Lady Margaret Cunningham (died c. 1622, Scotland), mem. & correspondent
Pat Cumper (b. 1954, England), pw.
Helena Parente Cunha (b. 1929, Brazil), wr. & educator
Maria Renee Cura (died 2007, Argentina), non-f. wr.
Cecilia Curbelo (b. 1975, Uruguay), wr. & col.
Suzanne Curchod (1737–1794, Switzerland/France), social mem. in French
Jean Curlewis (1898–1930, Argentina), ch. wr.
Judi Curtin (b. 1960s, Ireland), ch. wr.
Nannie Webb Curtis (1861-1920, United States), non-f. wr. & ed.
Dymphna Cusack (1902–1981, Australia), nv. & pw.
Margaret Anna Cusack (1829–1999, Ireland), biographer, social wr. & nun
Silvia Rivera Cusicanqui (b. 1949, Bolivia), historian & feminist
Rachel Cusk (b. 1967, Canada/Newfoundland), nv.
Sheila Cussons (1922–2004, South Africa), poet in Afrikaans
Catherine Cuthbertson (c. 1775–1842, England), nv.
Umihana Čuvidina (c. 1794 – c. 1870, Turkey/Ottoman Empire/Bosnia-Herzegovina), poet
Eunice P. Cutter (1819-1898), American, anatomy textbooks
Aleksandra Čvorović (b. 1976, Yugoslavia/Bosnia-Herzegovina), wr. & librarian
Ptolemais of Cyrene (3rd century BC or later, Ancient Greece), wr. on music
Izabela Czartoryska (1846–1935, Poland), Enlightenment wr.
Julie E. Czerneda (b. 1955, Canada/Newfoundland), science fiction & fantasy wr.
Sidney Czira (1889–1974, Ireland/United States), wr. & broadcaster

D

Da–Dh
Selma Dabbagh (b. 1970, Scotland/Palestine), fiction wr.
Emma Dabiri (b. 1979, Ireland/England), wr., academic & broadcaster
Maria Dąbrowska (1889–1965, Poland), nv., es. & pw.
Anne Dacier (1645–1720, France), scholar & translator
Luísa Dacosta (1927–2015, Portugal), fiction wr., poet & diarist
Esha Dadawala (b. 1985, India), poet & fiction wr.
Aneta Dadeshkeliani (1872–1922, Georgia (Caucasus)), poet & social reformer
Nino Dadeshkeliani (1890–1931, Georgia (Caucasus)), wr. & politician
Stella Dadzie (b. 1952, England), activist & historian
Emilia Dafni (1881–1941, Greece), poet, fiction wr. & pw.
Catrin Dafydd (b. c. 1982, Wales), wr. & poet
Fflur Dafydd (b. 1978, Wales), nv. & musician
Vilborg Dagbjartsdóttir (1930–2021, Iceland), poet
Elizabeth Frances Dagley (1788–1853, England), ch. wr.
Marianna Debes Dahl (b. 1947, Faroe Islands), fiction & ch. wr.
Tora Dahl (1886–1983, Sweden), nv. & educator
Ulla Dahlerup (b. 1942, Denmark), wr. & rights activist
Dai Houying (戴厚英, 1938–1996, China), nv.
Tamaki Daido (大道珠貴, b. 1966, Japan), radio scriptwriter & nv.
Lois Daish (living, New Zealand), food & cookery wr.
Jocelyne Dakhlia (b. 1959, France), historian & anthropologist
Marguerite Dale (1883–1963, Australia), pw. & feminist
Debra Daley (living, New Zealand), nv. & screenwriter
Yrsa Daley-Ward (b. 1989, England), poet
Gilberte H. Dallas (1918–1960, France/Switzerland), poet
Ruth Dallas (1919–2008, New Zealand), poet & ch. wr.
Ann Dally (1929–2007, England), wr. & psychiatrist
Ita Daly (b. 1945, Ireland), fiction & ch. writer
Mary E. Daly (living, Ireland), historian & academic
Kathleen Dalziel (1881–1969, Australia), poet
Achta Saleh Damane (living, Chad), wr. & politician
Svetla Damyanovska (living, Bulgaria), poet & fiction wr.
Virgilia D'Andrea (1888–1933, Italy), poet & politician
Jordan Dane (b. 1953, United States), thriller wr.
Utta Danella (1920–2015, Germany), fiction wr.
Simin Daneshvar (1921–2012, Iran/Persia), fiction wr. & academic
Tsitsi Dangarembga (b. 1959, Zimbabwe), wr. & filmmaker
Ana Daniel (1928–2011, Portugal), poet
Anna Dániel (1908–2003, Hungary), nv. & YA wr.
Cora Linn Daniels (1852–1934, United States), wr.
Tatyana Danilyants (b. 1971, Soviet Union/Russia), poet & film director
Mabel Dove Danquah (1910–1984, Ghana/Gold Coast), fiction wr.
Meri Nana-Ama Danquah (b. 1967, Ghana/Gold Coast/United States), wr. & editor
Edwidge Danticat (b. 1969, Haiti/United States), nv.
Zakya Daoud (b. 1937, France/Morocco), sociologist & historian
Xie Daoyun (謝道韞, pre-AD 340 – post-399, China), poet & calligrapher
Mildred Darby (1867–1932, Ireland), nv.
Ailbhe Darcy (b. 1981, Ireland), poet
Eleanor Dark (1901–1985, Australia), nv.
Amma Darko (b. 1956, Ghana/Gold Coast), nv.
Annie McCarer Darlington (1836-1907, United States), poet
Tina Darragh (b. 1950, United States), poet
Marie Darrieussecq (b. 1969, France), nv., biographer & ch. wr.
Cecilia Dart-Thornton (living, Australia), fantasy wr.
Helen Darville (Helen Dale, Helen Demidenko; b. 1972, Australia), col. & nv.
Kamala Das (1932–2009, India), poet & fiction wr.
Mahadai Das (1954–2003, Guyana), poet
Countess Dash (1804–1872, France), nv.
Filomena Dato (1856-1926, Spain), feminist, wr.
Sukanya Datta (b. 1961, India), zoologist & science wr.
Marcia Davenport (1903–1996, United States), nv., biographer & mem.
Selina Davenport (1779–1859, England), nv.
Gertrud David (1872–1936, Germany), screenwriter and col.
Henriette Davidis (1801–1876, Germany), cookery wr.
Joy Davidman (b. Helen Joy Davidman, 1915–1960, United States), wr. & poet
Alexandra David-Néel (1868–1969, France), traveler, wr. & Buddhist
Nadia Davids (b. 1977, South Africa), wr. & pw. in English
MaryJanice Davidson (b. 1969, United States), poet
Catherine Glyn Davies (1926–2007, Wales), philosopher & historian
Gwen Davies (b. 1964, Wales), translator & editor
Margaret Davies (c. 1700–1778 or 1785, Wales), poet & scribe
Mary Davies (1846–1882, Wales), poet
Amparo Dávila (1928–2020, Mexico), fiction wr.
Delia Davin (1944–2016, England), wr. on Chinese society
Winnie Davin (1909–1995, New Zealand/England), wr. & editor
Angela Davis (b. 1944, United States), philosopher & activist
Dorothy Salisbury Davis (1916−2014, United States), mystery nv.
Jackie Davis (b. 1963, New Zealand), nv., poet & pw.
Kyra Davis (b. 1972, United States), nv.
Lydia Davis (b. 1947, United States), fiction wr. & es.
Mary Hayes Davis (c.1884–1948, United States), folklore wr. & news editor
Norma Davis (1905–1945, Australia), poet
Rebecca Harding Davis (1831–1910, United States), nv. & col.
Annabel Davis-Goff (b. 1942, Ireland/United States), nv., screenwriter & academic
Vilborg Davíðsdóttir (b. 1965, Iceland), wr.
Hadiya Davletshina (1905–1954, Russia/Soviet Union), poet & pw.
Mary Davys (c. 1674–1732, Ireland), nv. & pw.
Elizabeth Dawbarn (died 1839, England), wr. on religion & child care
Abha Dawesar (b. 1974, India), nv. & artist
Pieretta Dawn (b. 1994, Thailand), wr. in English
Laura Day (b. 1959, United States), self-help wr.
Sarah Day (b. 1958, England/Australia), poet
Suzanne R. Day (1876–1964, Ireland), nv. & pw.
Tamasin Day-Lewis (b. 1953, England), cookery wr. & TV chef
Jean D'Costa (b. 1937, Jamaica), ch. wr. & linguist
Shobhaa De (b. 1947, India), col. & nv.
Janette Deacon (b. 1939, South Africa), archaeologist in English
Dulcie Deamer (1890–1972, Australia), nv., poet & actor
Louise Dean (b. 1970, England)
Pamela Dean (b. 1953, United States), nv.
Kathryn Deans (living, Australia), ch. wr.
Alice Dease (1874–1949, Ireland), wr. & folklorist
Charlotte Dease (1873–1953, Ireland), prayer collector & hagiographer
Djamila Debèche (1926–2010, Algeria/France), nv. & es.
Nicole de Buron (1929–2019, France), wr.
Denise Deegan (b. 1966, Ireland), screenwriter & fiction wr.
Teresa Deevy (1894–1963, Ireland), pw. & fiction wr.
Charlotte Burgis DeForest (1879–1973, United States), wr.
Régine Deforges (1935–2014, France), nv. & es.
Ellen DeGeneres (b. 1958, United States), wr. & comedian
Sadia Dehlvi (1957–2020, India), activist, wr. & col.
Sabine Deitmer (1947–2020, Germany), crime wr.
Draga Dejanović (1840–1871, Serbia), poet
Aagje Deken (1701–1804, Netherlands), poet & correspondent
E. M. Delafield (1890–1943, England), nv. & mem.
Lucy Delaney (c. 1830–c. 1890, United States), mem.
Mary Delany (1700–1788, England), correspondent & Bluestocking
Alix Delaporte (b. 1969, France), screenwriter & film director
Lucie Delarue-Mardrus (1874–1945, France), poet, nv. & col.
Elizabeth Delaval (c.1648–1717), British memoirist
Cella Delavrancea (1887–1991, Romania), fiction wr, mem. & musician
Florence Delay (b. 1941, France), academic & actor
Grazia Deledda (1871–1936, Italy), nv. & poet; 1926 Nobel Prize for Literature
Yanette Delétang-Tardif (1902–1976, France), poet, translator & nv.
Nieves Delgado (b. 1968, Spain), nv.
Susy Delgado (b. 1949, Paraguay), poet & wr. in Spanish & Guarani
Sahar Delijani (b. 1983, Iran/Persia), nv.
Ella Cara Deloria (1888–1971, United States), ethnographer, historian & nv.
Jeanine Delpech (1905-1992, France), journalist, translator & nv.
Penelope Delta (1874–1941, Greece), ch. wr. & nv.
Gabriëlle Demedts (1909–2002, Belgium), poet in Flemish
Rita Demeester (1946–1993), Belgium), poet & wr. in Flemish
Esther Dendel (1910–2002), American non-fiction writer
Radka Denemarková (b. 1968, Czechoslovakia/Czech Republic), nv. & screenplay wr.
Zsófia Dénes (1885–1987, Hungary), critic & biographer
Irina Denezhkina (b. 1981, Soviet Union/Russia), fiction wr.
Marina Denikina (1919–2005, Russia/France), political historian
Sylvie Denis (b. 1963, France), science fiction wr.
Nicole Dennis-Benn (b. 1982, Jamaica), nv. & story wr.
Márcia Denser (b. 1949, Brazil), wr. & academic
Laurence Deonna (b. 1937, Switzerland), political wr. in French
Maria Deraismes (1828–1894, France), feminist wr.
Raghida Dergham (b. 1953, Lebanon/United States), col.
Enid Derham (1882–1941, Australia), poet
Regina Derieva (1949–2013, Soviet Union/Russia), poet & wr.
Maria Dermoût (1888–1962, Netherlands), nv.
Jeanne Deroin (1805–1894, France), political wr.
Sophie Deroisin (1909–1994, Belgium), nv. in French
Toi Derricotte (b. 1941, United States), poet
Suat Derviş (1904 or 1905–1972, Turkey/Ottoman Empire), nv. & activist
Dominika Dery (b. 1975, Czechoslovakia/Czech Republic), poet & mem.
Anita Desai (b. 1937, India), nv.
Kamal Desai (1928–2011, India), nv.
Kiran Desai (b. 1971, India), nv.
Dominique Desanti (1920–2011, France), nv., biographer & col.
Agnès Desarthe (b. 1966, France), nv. & ch. wr.
Maryline Desbiolles (b. 1959, France), wr.
Marceline Desbordes-Valmore (1786–1859, France), poet
Anne Desclos, 1907–1998, France), col. & nv.
Antoinette du Ligier de la Garde Deshoulières (1638–1694, France), poet
Gauri Deshpande (1942–2003, India), fiction wr. & poet
Shashi Deshpande (b. 1938, India), nv.
Sunita Deshpande (1926–2009, India), wr.
Roxane Desjardins (born 1991), Canada), wr.
Marie-Anne Desmarest (1904–1973, France), nv.
Pip Desmond (living, New Zealand), social wr.
Virginie Despentes (b. 1969, France), nv.
Marie Desplechin (b. 1959, France), fiction & ch. wr.
Madeleine Desroseaux (1873–1939, France), poet & nv.
Victoria de Stefano (1940–2023, Italy/Venezuela), nv. & es.
Jessica Dettmann (living, Australia), nv.
Babette Deutsch (1895–1982, United States), poet, critic, & nv.
Jean Devanny (1894–1962, Australia), fiction & non-f. wr.
Alexis De Veaux (b. 1948, United States), wr. & illustrator
Mary Deverell (1731–1805, England), religious wr. & poet
Ashapoorna Devi (1909–1995, India), nv. & poet
Leela Devi (1932–1998, India), wr. & educator
Mahasweta Devi (1926–2016, India), nv. & wr.
Maitreyi Devi (1914–1990, India), poet & nv.
M. K. Binodini Devi (1922–2011, India), fiction wr. & pw.
Nalini Bala Devi (1898–1977, India), poet & writer
Nirupama Devi (1883–1951, India), fiction wr.
Vimala Devi (b. 1932, Goa/Spain),
Martina Devlin (living, Ireland), nv. & col.
Polly Devlin (b. 1944, wr. & broadcaster
Caroline Dexter (1819–1884, England/Australia), feminist
Leena Dhingra (living, India/England), wr. & actor
Éilís Ní Dhuibhne (b. 1954, Ireland), fiction wr.
Christine D'haen (1923–2009), wr. & poet in French
Dhuoda (c. 803–c. 843, France), moralist in Latin; Liber Manualis

Di–Dy
Ndèye Coumba Mbengue Diakhaté (1924–2001, Senegal), poet & educator
Nafissatou Niang Diallo (1941–1982, Senegal), social wr. & mem.
Aïssatou Diamanka-Besland (b. 1972, Senegal), nv. & lyricist
Anita Diamant (b. 1951, United States), fiction & non-f. wr.
Máirín Diamond (b. 1957, Ireland), poet
Olga Xirinacs Díaz (b. 1936, Spain), wr. & musician
Marta Yolanda Díaz-Durán (b. 1968, Guatemala), academic
Paloma Díaz-Mas (b. 1954, Spain), nv. & pw.
Kate DiCamillo (b. 1964, United States), ch. wr.
Adelia Di Carlo (1883–1965, Argentina), wr., chronicler, founder
Monica Dickens (1915–1992, England), nv. & mem.
Emily Dickinson (1830–1886, United States), poet
Susan E. Dickinson (1842–1915, United States), correspondent
Joan Didion (1934–2021, United States), col., es. & nv.
Maria Teresa Cruz San Diego (living, Philippines), nv. in Tagalog
Alice Mangold Diehl (1844–1912, England), nv. & musician
Mame Younousse Dieng (1939–2016, Senegal), nv. & poet
Carole Dieschbourg (b. 1977, Luxembourg), writer & politician
Florence Carpenter Dieudonné (1850–1927, United States), fiction wr.
Jane Dieulafoy (1851–1916, France), archaeologist & nv.
Margarita Diez-Colunje y Pombo (1838–1919, Colombia), historian, translator, genealogist
Annie Le Porte Diggs (1853–1916, Canada/Newfoundland), poet & wr.
Emilia Dilke (1840–1904, England), social wr. & art critic
Annie Dillard (b. 1945, United States), non-f. wr., poet & nv.
Eilís Dillon (1920–1994, Ireland), nv. & YA wr.
Amy Dillwyn (1845–1935, Wales), nv.
Constance Dima (b. 1948, Gk), wr., poet & translator
Ophelia Dimalanta (1932–2010, Philippines), poet, wr. & teacher
Lidija Dimkovska (b. 1971, North Macedonia/Slovenia), poet, nv. & translator
Jelena Dimitrijević (1862–1945, Serbia), fiction wr. & poet
Blaga Dimitrova (1922–2003, Belgium), poet & politician
Kristin Dimitrova (b. 1963, Bulgaria), wr. & poet
Kiki Dimoula (1931–2020, Greece), poet
Theodora Dimova (b. 1960, Bulgaria), nv. & pw.
Isak Dinesen (1885–1962, Denmark), nv.; Out of Africa
Ding Ling (丁玲, 1904–1986, China), nv.
Güzin Dino (1910–2013, Turkey/Ottoman Empire/France), scholar & political wr.
Fatou Diome (b. 1968, Senegal), nv.
Nafissatou Dia Diouf (b. 1973, Senegal), poet & fiction wr.
Farida Diouri (1953–2004, Morocco), nv. in French
Kelly DiPucchio (b. 1967, United States), ch. wr.
Zora Dirnbach (1929–2019, Croatia), journalist & wr.
Jenny Diski (1947–2016, England), wr.
Clotilde Dissard (1873–1919, France), journalist, feminist
Tove Ditlevsen (1917–1976, Denmark), poet, nv. & autobiographer
Chitra Banerjee Divakaruni (b. 1956, India/United States), poet & fiction wr.
Margaret A. Dix (b. 1939, Channel Islands/Guatemala), botanist
Lady Florence Dixie (1855–1905, Scotland), travel, war & fiction wr.
Varsha Dixit (living, India/United States), nv.
Isobel Dixon (b. 1969, South Africa), poet in English
Négar Djavadi (b. 1969, Iran/Persia/France), nv. & screenwriter
Assia Djebar (1936–2015, Algeria), nv. & filmmaker
Rabia Djelti (b. 1954, Algeria), poet, nv. & educator
Elena Djionat (1888 – post-1936, Romania), political wr. & activist
Anastasia Dmitruk (b. 1991, Ukraine), poet
Valentina Dmitryeva (1859–1947, Russia/Soviet Union), fiction wr.
Gillian Dobbie (living, New Zealand), computer scientist
Louisa Emily Dobrée (fl. ca. 1877–1917, France), nv., ss. wr., juvenile wr. & non-f. wr.
Rosemary Dobson (1920–2012, Australia), poet
Anna Bowman Dodd (1858–1929, United States), wr.
Lynley Dodd (b. 1941, New Zealand), ch. wr. & illustrator
Mary Mapes Dodge (1831–1905, United States), ch. wr.; Hans Brinker, or The Silver Skates
Mary Ann Hanmer Dodd (1813–1878, United States), poet
Mary Diana Dods (David Lyndsay, 1790–1830, Scotland), fiction wr.
Anna Dodsworth (c. 1740–1801, Britain), poet
Thea Doelwijt (b. 1938, Suriname), fiction & ch. wr. & pw.
Harriet Doerr (1910–2002, United States), nv.
Mary Crow Dog (1954–2013, United States), wr. & activist
Brenda DoHarris (living, Guyana), poet
Ann Doherty (c. 1786 – c. 1831–1832, England), nv. & pw.
Berlie Doherty (b. 1943, England), nv., poet & ch. wr.
Dorcas Dole (fl. later 17th century, England), Quaker pamphleteer
Veronika Dolina (b. 1956, Soviet Union/Russia), poet & songwriter
Elvira Dolinar (1870–1961, Austria/Austria-Hungary/Yugoslavia), col. in Slovenian
Emma Dolujanoff (1922–2013, Mexico), wr.
Janina Domanska (1913–1995, Poland/United States), ch. wr. & illustrator
Alcina Lubitch Domecq (b. 1953, Guatemala/Israel), fiction wr.
Maria Doménech (1877–1954, Spain), nv., poet & pw.
Hilde Domin (1909–2006, Germany), poet
Anni Domingo (b. 1950s, England), nv., poet & pw
Delia Domínguez (1931–2022, Chile), poet
María Domínguez (1882–1936, Spain), poet & politician
María Magdalena Domínguez (1922–2021, Spain), poet 
Lady Margaret Domville (1840–1929, Ireland), religious wr.
Robyn Donald (b. 1940, New Zealand), nv.
Elvira Dones (b. 1960, Albania/Switzerland), nv. & screenwriter
Marion Dönhoff (1909–2002), col.
Maite Dono (b. 1969, Spain), poet & songwriter
Emma Donoghue (b. 1969, Ireland/Canada/Newfoundland), pw., nv. & literary historian
Darya Dontsova (b. 1952, Soviet Union/Russia), fiction & scriptwriter
Compiuta Donzella (fl. late 13th century, Italy), poet
Maria Doolaeghe (1803–1884, Belgium), wr. in Flemish
Aoife Dooley (b. 1991, Ireland), wr. & illustrator
Robyn Doolittle (b. 1984, Canada/Newfoundland), col.
Carolina Marcial Dorado (1889–1941, Spain/United States), textbook wr.
Mary Dorcey (b. 1950, Ireland), poet & fiction wr.
Mara Đorđević-Malagurski (1894–1971, Serbia), wr. & ethnologist
Geneviève Dormann (1933–2015, France), fiction wr. & col.
Renate Dorrestein (1954–2018, Netherlands), fiction wr. & feminist
Mathilda d'Orozco (Mathilda Montgomery-Cederhjelm; 1796–1863, Italy/Sweden), salonnière, poet & wr.
Doris Dörrie (b. 1955, Germany), fiction & ch. wr. & critic
Anna Dostoevskaya (1846–1918, Russia), mem. & philatelist
Lyubov Dostoyevskaya (1869–1926, Russia/Italy), mem.
Sarah Doudney (1841–1926, England), ch. wr. & poet
Ellen Douglas (1921–2012, United States), fiction & non-f. wr.
Mona Douglas (1898–1987, Isle of Man), poet & folklorist
Myra Douglas (1844–?, United States), wr., poet
O. Douglas (1877–1948, Scotland), nv.
Sara Douglass (1957–2011, Australia), fantasy nv.
Maro Douka (b. 1947, Gk), nv.
Teresa Dovalpage (b. 1966, Cuba/United States), nv.
Nah Dove (b. 1940s, UK), non-f. wr.
Rita Dove (b. 1952, United States), poet
Ceridwen Dovey (b. 1980, South Africa/Australia), nv.
Beatrice von Dovsky (1866–1923, Austria/Austria-Hungary), poet, librettist & actor
Unity Dow (b. 1959, Botswana), activist & nv.
Mary Frances Dowdall (1876–1939, England), nv. & non-f. wr.
Sediqeh Dowlatabadi (1882–1961, Iran/Persia), correspondent
Finuala Dowling (b. 1962, South Africa), poet & nv. in English
Ellen Mary Patrick Downing (1828–1969, Ireland), poet & nun
Mary Downing (c. 1815–1881, Ireland/England), poet
Margaret Drabble (b. 1939, England), nv. & biographer
Emmy Drachmann (1854–1928, Denmark), nv. & mem.
Gusta Dawidson Draenger (1917–1943, Poland), diarist & Hc. victim
Rajna Dragićević (living, Serbia), lexicographer & academic
Tonke Dragt (b. 1930, Netherlands), ch. wr. & illustrator
Judith Drake (late 17th century, England), feminist es.
Slavenka Drakulić (b. 1949, Yugoslavia/Croatia), nv. & es.
Augusta Theodosia Drane (1823–1894, England), religious wr. & biographer
Camille Drevet (1881–1969, France), non-f. wr.
Catharine Drew (1832–1910, Ireland/England), nv. & col.
Ingeborg Drewitz (1923–1986, Germany), pw. & nv.
Paola Drigo (1876–1938, Italy), fiction wr.
Daša Drndić (1946–2018, Yugoslavia/Croatia), nv. & pw.
Edwige-Renée Dro (living, Ivory Coast), wr. & activist
Celia Dropkin (1887–1956, Belarus/United States), poet in Yiddish
Annette von Droste-Hülshoff (1797–1848, Germany), poet
Joan Druett (b. 1939, New Zealand), nv. & historian
Alison Edith Hilda Drummond (1903–1984, New Zealand), historian & farmer
Ree Drummond (b. 1969, United States), wr. & food wr.
Yulia Drunina (1924–1991, Soviet Union), poet & fiction wr.
Anna Harriett Drury (1824–1912, England), poet & nv.
Helene von Druskowitz (1856–1918, Austria/Austria-Hungary), pw., critic & poet
Elżbieta Drużbacka (1695/1698–1765, Poland), poet
Svetlana Druzhinina (b. 1935, Soviet Union/Russia), screenwriter & actor
Nora Dryhurst (1856–1930, Ireland/England), wr. & translator
Duan Shuqing (端淑卿, c. 1510 – c. 1600, China), poet
Caitilin Dubh (fl. c. 1624, Ireland), poet
Caroline Dubois (b. 1960, France), poet
Dorothea Du Bois (1728–1774, Ireland), poet, autobiographer & pw.
Ursula Dubosarsky (b. 1961, Australia), ch. & YA fiction & non-f. wr.
Louis Dubrau (1904–1997, Belgium), fiction wr. & poet in French
Charlotte Dubreuil (b. 1940, France), nv. & filmmaker
Marilyn Duckworth (b. 1935, New Zealand), fiction wr. & poet
Agnes Mary Frances Duclaux (1857–1944, England), poet, nv., es., literary critic & translator
Diane Ducret (B), fiction & non-f. wr.
Tessa Duder (b. 1940, New Zealand), YA, fiction & non-f. wr. & pw.
María Dueñas (b. 1964, Spain), nv.
Lucie, Lady Duff-Gordon (1821–1869, England/Egypt), history wr. & Arabist
Bella Duffy (1849–1926, Ireland/Italy), writer
Carol Ann Duffy (b. 1955, Scotland), poet & pw.; first female & Scottish Poet Laureate of the United Kingdom
Catherine Dufour (b. 1966, France), science fiction & fantasy nv.
Eileen Duggan (1894–1972, New Zealand), poet & col.
Kate Duignan (b. 1974, New Zealand), fiction wr. & educator
Yolanda Vargas Dulché (1926–1999, Mexico), cartoon wr.
Nurduran Duman (b. 1974, Turkey/Ottoman Empire), poet & pw.
Firoozeh Dumas (b. 1965, Iran/Persia/United States), mem. & nv.
Bucura Dumbravă (1868–1926, Romania), nv. & theosophist
Zoe Dumitrescu-Bușulenga (1920–2006, Romania), political wr.
Marilyn Dumont (b. 1955, Canada/Newfoundland), poet
Sarah Dunant (b. 1950, England), nv.
Raya Dunayevskaya (1910–1987, Ukraine/United States), philosopher
Andrea Dunbar (1961–1990, England), pw.
Lois Duncan (1934–2016, United States), YA wr.
Susan Duncan (b. 1951, Australia), mem. & nv.
Elaine Dundy (1931–2008, United States), col., nv. & biographer
Camille Dungy (b. 1972, United States), poet & professor
Mabel Dunham (1881–1957, Canada/Newfoundland), nv.
Kinga Dunin (b. 1954, Poland), nv. & sociologist
Clare B. Dunkle (b. 1964, United States), ch. fantasy wr. & librarian
Gloria Dünkler (b. 1977, Chile), poet & folklorist
Nell Dunn (b. 1936, UK), pw. & screenwriter
Katherine Dunn (1945–2016, United States), nv., col. & poet
Rachel Blau DuPlessis (b. 1941, United States), poet, es. & scholar
Maria José Dupré (1905–1984, Brazil), nv.
Mary Durack (1913–1994, Australia), nv. & ch. wr.
Ariel Durant (1898–1981, Ukraine/United States), social philosopher & mem.
Francesca Duranti (b. 1935, Italy), fiction wr.
Claire de Duras (1777–1828, France), nv.
Marguerite Duras (1914–1996, France), nv., pw. & screenwriter
Bohdana Durda (b. 1940, Ukraine), wr., poet & song wr.
Vanessa Duriès (1972–1993, France), nv.
Jessica Durlacher (b. 1961, Netherlands), critic & nv.
Ljiljana Habjanović Đurović (b. 1953, Serbia), nv.
Tehmina Durrani (b. 1953, Pakistan), wr. & activist
Marie Dušková (1903–1968, Czechoslovakia/Czech Republic), poet
Nirupama Dutt (b. 1955, India), poet
Toru Dutt (1856–1877, India/England), poet
Yvette Duval (1931–2006, Morocco/France), historian
Karen Duve (b. 1961, Germany), fiction wr.
Mona Van Duyn (1921–2004, United States), poet
Gergina Dvoretzka (living, Belgium), poet & col.
Maryna and Serhiy Dyachenko (b. 1968 & 1945–2022, Ukraine/United States), novelists
Wanda Dynowska (1888–1971, Poland), theosophist & political wr.

E

Ea–Em
Elizabeth Jessup Eames (1813–1856, United States), wr. & poet
Marion Eames (1921–2007, Wales), nv. & translator
Mary Tracy Earle (1864–1955, United States), wr.
Beverley East (b. 1953, Jamaica), wr.
Alice Eather (1988/1989–2017, Australia), poet & environmentalist
Edith Maude Eaton (Sui Sin Far; 1865–1914, Chile/Canada/Newfoundland), nv.
Winnifred Eaton (Watanna Onoto; 1875–1954, Chile/Canada/Newfoundland), fiction wr.
Françoise d'Eaubonne (1920–2005, France), es. & nv.
Shirin Ebadi (b. 1947, Iran/Persia), activist; Nobel Peace Prize 2003
Isabelle Eberhardt (1877–1904, Switzerland/Algeria), political wr. in French
Margareta Ebner (1291–1351, Germany), diarist & mystic
Marie von Ebner-Eschenbach (1830–1916, Austria/Austria-Hungary), nv.
Charlotte O'Conor Eccles (1860–1911, Ireland), nv. & translator
Fadela Echebbi (b. 1946, Tunisia), poet
Robyn Eckersley (b. 1958, Australia), political theorist
Elaine Howard Ecklund (living, United States), academic
Bertha Eckstein-Diener (Sir Galahad, 1874–1948, Austria/Austria-Hungary), historian & travel wr.
Nydia Ecury (1926–2012, Curaçao), poet & translator
Leigh Eddings (1939–2007, United States), fantasy nv.
Reni Eddo-Lodge (b. 1989, England), col. & wr.
Inger Edelfeldt (b. 1956, Sweden), fiction & ch. wr. & illustrator
Aida Edemariam (fl. 2014–, Ethiopia/Canada/Newfoundland), col. & mem.
Dorothy Eden (1912–1982, New Zealand/England), fiction wr.
Emily Eden (1797–1869, England), nv. & poet
Arabella Edge (fl. 2000–, England/Australia), fiction wr.
Zee Edgell (1940–2020, Belize), nv.
Frances Anne Edgeworth (1769–1865, Ireland), mem. & botanical artist
Maria Edgeworth (1767–1849, England/Ireland), nv.; Castle Rackrent
May Edginton (1883–1957, England), nv.
Lauris Edmond (1924–2000, New Zealand), poet & fiction wr.
Harriet Edquist (fl. 1989–, Australia), architectural historian
Esi Edugyan (b. 1978, Canada/Newfoundland), nv. & wr.
Summer Edward (b. 1986, Trinidad), wr. & activist
Amelia Edwards (1831–1892, England), fiction wr. & poet
Annie Edwards (c. 1830–1896, England), nv.
Fanny Winifred Edwards (1876–1959, Wales), ch. wr. & teacher
Ruth Dudley Edwards (b. 1944, Ireland), historian, biographer & crime wr.
Yvvette Edwards (fl. 2011–, England), nv.
Zena Edwards (b. 1960s, England), poet
Françoise Ega (1920–1976, Martinique), nv.
Jennifer Egan (b. 1962, United States); fiction wr.
Susanna Eger (1640–1713, Germany), cookery wr.
Egeria (Aetheria) (fl. AD 381–384, Algeria), pilgrim & correspondent in Latin
George Egerton (1859–1945, Ireland/England), fiction wr.
Helen Merrill Egerton (1866–1951, Canada), poet, non-f. wr.
Elizabeth Eggleston (1934–1976, Australia), wr., activist & lawyer
Elsebeth Egholm (b. 1960, Denmark), crime wr.
Elen Egryn (Elin Evans, 1807–1876, Wales), poet
María Egual (1655–1735, Spain), poet & pw.
Alicia Eguren (1924–1977, Argentina), poet & es.
Barbara Ehrenreich (1941–2022, United States), feminist & activist
Marianne Ehrenström (1773–1867, Sweden), wr.
Marianne Ehrmann (1755–1795, Switzerland), nv. & publicist in German
Adelaïde Ehrnrooth (1815–1905, Finland), feminist & wr. in Swedish
Tamara Eidelman (living, Soviet Union/Russia), historian & educator
Eiki Eiki (影木栄貴, b. 1971, Japan), manga creator
Charlotte Eilersgaard (1858–1922, Denmark), fiction wr. & pw.
Lena Einhorn (b. 1954, Sweden), mem., pw. & screenwriter
Paula Einöder (b. 1974, Uruguay), poet & wr.
Oddný Eir (b. 1972, Iceland), nv.
Kerstin Ekman (b. 1933, Sweden), fiction wr.
Margareta Ekström (1930–2021, Sweden), poet, nv. & ch. wr.
Elaine Eksvärd (b. 1981, Sweden), non-f. wr.
Nana Ekvtimishvili (b. 1978, Georgia (Caucasus)), wr. & film director
Naima El Bezaz (1974–2020, Morocco/Netherlands), wr.
Roza Eldarova (1923–2021, Soviet Union/Russia), wr. & politician
Anne Elder (1918–1976, Australia), poet & dancer
Olivia Elder (1735–1780, Ireland), poet
Flora Eldershaw (1897–1956, Australia), nv., critic & historian
Elephantis (fl. late 1st century BC, Ancient Greece), erotic poet
Ada María Elflein (1880–1919, Argentina), poet, col. & translator
Menna Elfyn (b. 1952, Wales), poet, pw. & editor
Laila el-Haddad (b. 1978, Palestine/United States), wr. on Palestine & food
Safia Elhillo (b. 1990, Sudan/United States), poet
Anilú Elías (b. 1937, Mexico), scholar & activist
María Luisa Elío (1926–2009, Spain/Mexico), screenwriter
George Eliot (Marian Evans, 1819–1880, England), nv. & poet; Middlemarch
Elisabeth of Wied (1843–1916, Romania), Queen Consort & poet
Caroline Elkins (b. 1969, United States), prof. & non-f. wr.
Elizabeth F. Ellet (1818–1877, United States), wr. & poet
Bina Sarkar Ellias (b. 1949, India), poet, wr. & editor
Anne Elliot (1856–1941, England), nv.
Lady Charlotte Elliot (1839–1880, Scotland), poet
Janice Elliott (1931–1995, England), fiction & ch. wr.
Marianne Elliott (living, Ireland/England), historian
Lucy Ellmann (b. 1956, United States/Scotland), nv.
Alice Thomas Ellis (Anna Haycraft, 1932–3005, England), fiction & non-f. wr.
Ellen Elizabeth Ellis (1829–1895, England/New Zealand), nv. & activist
Keisha Lynne Ellis (fl. 2009 onward, Bahamas), political scientist
Lucy Ellmann (b. 1956, United States/Scotland), nv.
Nawal el-Saadawi (1931–2021, Egypt), feminist & fiction wr.
Barbara Else (b. 1947, New Zealand), fiction & ch. wr. & pw.
Gisela Elsner (1939–1992, Germany), nv.
Elizabeth Elstob (1683–1756, England), feminist & translator
Diamela Eltit (b. 1949, Chile), wr. & academic
Lynn Emanuel (b. 1949, United States), poet
Buchi Emecheta (1944–2017, Nigeria), nv.
Claudia Emerson (1957–2014, United States), poet & academic
Ellen Russell Emerson (1837–1907, United States), wr. & ethnologist
Akwaeke Emezi (b. 1987, Nigeria), fiction wr.
Lelia Dromgold Emig (1872-1957, United States), genealogist & non-f. wr.
Carol Emshwiller (1921–2019, United States), fiction wr.
Angella Emurwon (living, Uganda), pw.

En–Ez
Amanda Enayati (living, Iran/Persia/United States), health wr.
Fumiko Enchi (円地文子, 1905–1986, Japan), pw. & fiction wr.
María Dolores Pérez Enciso (1908–1949, Spain/Mexico), social wr.
Alberthiene Endah (living, Indonesia), biographer & nv.
Chuah Guat Eng (蔡月英, b. 1943, Malaysia), fiction wr. in English
Marian Engel (1933–1985, Canada/Newfoundland), nv.
Dorothe Engelbretsdatter (1634–1716, Norway), poet & hymn wr.
Helene von Engelhardt (1850–1910, Germany), poet, wr. & linguist
Edith Mary England (1899–1979/1981, Australia), nv. & poet
Isobel English (1920–1994, England), nv.
Françoise Enguehard (b. 1957, Canada/Newfoundland), prose wr. in French
Enheduanna (2285–2250 BC, Ancient Sumeria), poet & royal priestess
Maki Enjōji (円城寺マキ, living, Japan), manga creator
Nariko Enomoto (榎本ナリコ, b. 1967, Japan), manga creator
Anna Enquist (b. 1945, Netherlands), poet & nv.
Anne Enright (b. 1962, Ireland), fiction writer
Kalilah Enríquez (b. 1983, Belize/Jamaica), col. & poet
Mariana Enríquez (b. 1973, Algeria), fiction wr. & col.
Anne Enright (b. 1962, Ireland), fiction wr. & es.
José Ensch (1942–2008, Luxembourg), poet
Riemke Ensing (b. 1939, Netherlands/New Zealand), poet & academic
Camelia Entekhabifard (b. 1973, Iran/Persia/United States), wr.
Fotini Epanomitis (b. 1969, Australia), nv.
Nora Ephron (1941–2012, United States), nv. & screenwriter
Pamphile of Epidaurus (1st century AD, Ancient Greece), historian
Muzi Epifani (1935–1984, Italy), nv., poet & pw.
Helen Epstein (b. 1947, Czechoslovakia/Czech Republic/United States), biographer & mem.
Noura Erakat (b. 1980, United States), wr. on Palestine
Ruth Erat (b. 1951, Switzerland), fiction wr. in German
Leyla Erbil (1931–2013, Turkey/Ottoman Empire), wr.
Aslı Erdoğan (b. 1967, Turkey/Ottoman Empire), wr. and activist
Louise Erdrich (b. 1954, United States), nv., poet & ch. wr.
Rica Erickson (1908–2009, Australia), botany & history wr.
Helena Eriksson (b. 1962, Sweden), poet
Erinna (Ἤριννα, fl. c. 600 BC, Ancient Greece), poet
Anastasia Eristavi-Khoshtaria (1868–1951, Georgia (Caucasus)), nv.
Dominika Eristavi (1864–1929, Georgia (Caucasus)), poet & prose wr.
Annie Ernaux (b. 1940, France), nv. & autobiographer
Maria Ernestam (b. 1959, Sweden), fiction wr.
Annette Mbaye d'Erneville (b. 1926, Senegal), poet & ch. wr.
Henrica van Erp (c. 1480–1548, Netherlands), chronicler & abbess
Jenny Erpenbeck (b. 1967, Germany), fiction wr. and pw.
María de los Ángeles Errisúriz (b. 1966, Mexico), wr. on education
Tina Escaja (b. 1965, Spain/United States), poet, fiction wr. & pw.
Ximena Escalante (b. 1964, Mexico), pw.
Alicia Escardó (b. 1963, Uruguay), fiction wr. & educator
Nataly von Eschstruth (1860–1939, Germany), fiction wr. and pw.
Edith Escombe (1866–1950, England), fiction wr. & es.
Gloria Escomel (b. 1941, Uruguay/Canada/Newfoundland), fiction wr.
Margaret Escott (1908–1977, New Zealand), nv., poet & educator
Rosemary Esehagu (b. 1981, Nigeria/United States), nv.
Rosario María Gutiérrez Eskildsen (1899–1979, Mexico), linguist & poet
Catharine H. Esling (1812–1897, United States), poet, wr., hymn wr.
Erminda Rentoul Esler (c. 1852–1924, Ireland), fiction wr.
Florbela Espanca (1894–1930, Portugal), poet
Teresa Espasa (living, Spain), poet, es. & professor
Kristin Espinasse (b. 1968, United States), wr.
Ileana Espinel (1933–2001, Ecuador), poet & wr.
Ramabai Espinet (b. 1948, Trinidad), poet, nv. & critic
Laura Esquivel (b. 1950, Mexico), nv.
Sofia Ester (b. 1978, Portugal), YA wr.
Elsa d'Esterre-Keeling (1857–1935, Ireland), nv. & educator
Eleanor Estes (1906–1988, United States), ch. wr.
Clarissa Pinkola Estés (b. 1945, United States), poet
Gisèle d'Estoc (1845–1894, France), non-f. wr.
Jenny Estrada (b. 1940, Ecuador), social wr.
Makiko Esumi (江角マキコ, b. 1966, Japan), non-f. wr. & lyricist
Eloísa García Etchegoyhen (1921–1996, Uruguay), education wr.
Claire Etcherelli (b. 1934, France), nv.
Gabriela Etcheverry (b. 1946, Chile/Canada/Newfoundland), wr. & critic
Parvin E'tesami (1907–1941, Iran/Persia), poet
Mansoureh Ettehadieh (living, Iran/Persia), historian
Lucía Etxebarría (b. 1966, Spain), biographer & nv.
Luisa Etxenike (b. 1957, Spain), fiction wr., pw. & poet
Cecilia Eudave (b. 1968, Mexico), fiction wr.
Aelia Eudocia (c. 401–460, Byzantium), religious wr. in Greek
Damiana Eugenio (1921–2014, Philippines), wr. & academic
Eun Mihee (은미희, b. 1960, Korea), nv., col. & academic
Jang Eun-jin (장은진, b. 1976, Korea), wr.
Lolita Euson (1914–1994, Sint Eustatius), poet
Janet Evanovich (b. 1943, United States), nv.
Anne Evans (1820–1870, England), poet & composer
Augusta Jane Evans (1835–1909, United States), nv.
Christine Evans (b. 1943, Wales), poet
Diana Evans (b. c. 1971, England), nv., col. & critic
Mari Evans (1923–2017, United States), poet, pw. & ch. wr.
Matilda Jane Evans (1827–1886, Australia), nv.
Lizzie P. Evans-Hansell (1836–1922, United States), fiction wr.
Bernardine Evaristo (b. 1959, England), wr.
Conceição Evaristo (b. 1946, Brazil), social wr.
Marjorie Evasco (b. 1953, Philippines), poet
Maria Louise Eve (1842–1900, United States), poet
Elizabeth Hawley Everett (1857–1940, United States), editor, wr
Zdravka Evtimova (b. 1959, Bulgaria), fiction wr.
Barbara Ewing (b. 1939, New Zealand/England), nv., actor & pw.
Emma Pike Ewing (1838–1917, United States), wr. & educator
Eve Ewing (b. 1986, United States), wr., poet & artist
Juliana Horatia Ewing (1841–1885, England), ch. wr.
Elisabeth Eybers (1915–2007, South Africa), poet in Afrikaans
Leonora Eyles (1889–1960, England), feminist wr. & nv.
Regīna Ezera (1930–2002, Latvia), nv.

F

Fa–Fl
Camilla Faà (c. 1599–1662, Italy), autobiographer & nun
Edda Fabbri (b. 1949, Uruguay), fiction wr.
Anne Faber (living, Luxembourg/England), cookery wr.
Michèle Fabien (1945–1999, Belgium), wr. & pw. in French
Mary Fabilli (1914–2011, United States), poet & illustrator
Kinga Fabó (1953–2021, Hungary), poet & es.
Paloma Fabrykant (b. 1981, Argentina), non-f. wr. & artist
Diane Fahey (b. 1945, Australia), poet
Jacqueline Fahey (b. 1929, New Zealand), mem. & painter
Diamante Medaglia Faini (1724–1770, Italy), poet & composer
Elizabeth Fair (1908–1997, England), nv.
Lidia Falcón (b. 1935, Spain), pw. & es.
Suzanne Falkiner (b. 1952, Australia), nv. & non-f. wr.
Aminata Sow Fall (b. 1941, Senegal), nv.
Khadi Fall (b. 1948, Senegal), nv.
Kiné Kirama Fall (b. 1934, Senegal), poet
Oriana Fallaci (1929–2006, Italy), non-f. wr.
Amber Fallon (b. 1993, United States), horror wr.
Katie Fallon (b. 1976, United States), es. & non-f. wr.
Fan Xiaoqing (范小青, b. 1955, China), fiction wr.
Elena Fanailova (b. 1962, Soviet Union/Russia), poet
Fang Fang (方方, b. 1955, China), poet & nv.
Diane Fanning (b. 1950, United States), wr. on crime & nv.
Teresa González de Fanning (1836–1918, Peru), nv. & col.
Ann, Lady Fanshawe (1625–1680, England), mem.
Catherine Maria Fanshawe (1765–1834, England), poet
Ursula Fanthorpe (1929–2009, England), poet
Elena Farago (1878–1954, Romania), poet & ch. wr.
Najwa Kawar Farah (1923–2015, Palestine/Canada/Newfoundland), fiction & ch. wr. & autobiographer
Rosa Lobato de Faria (1932–2010, Portugal), nv., poet & actor
Lily Yulianti Farid (b. 1971, Indonesia), fiction wr.
Beverley Farmer (1941–2018, Australia), fiction wr.
Nancy Farmer (b. 1941, United States), YA & ch. nv.
Penelope Farmer (b. 1939, England), ch. nv.; Charlotte Sometimes
Fadhila El Farouk (b. 1967, Algeria/Lebanon), nv.
Fiona Farrell (b. 1947, New Zealand), poet, fiction wr. & pw.
Forough Farrokhzad (1935–1967, Iran/Persia), poet & film director
Pooran Farrokhzad (1933–2016, Iran/Persia), poet, pw. & encyclopedist
Angie Farrow (b. 1951, England/New Zealand), academic & wr. for theater & radio
Bushra Farrukh (b. 1957, Pakistan), poet
Leila Farsakh (b. 1967, Palestine/United States), political economist
Lilian Faschinger (b. 1950, Austria/Austria-Hungary), fiction wr. & poet
Malika al-Fassi (1919–2007, Morocco), pw. & fiction wr.
Adélaïde Fassinou (b. 1955, Benin), fiction wr.
Nazila Fathi (b. 1970, Iran/Persia/Canada/Newfoundland), political mem.
Altaf Fatima (1927–2018, India/Pakistan), fiction wr.
Geneviève Fauconnier (1886–1969, France), nv.
Margaretta Faugères (1771–1801, United States), poet
Gertrude Minnie Faulding (1875–1961, England), nv. & ch. wr.
Jesse Redmon Fauset (1882–1961, United States), poet, es. & nv.
Beatrice Faust (1939–2019, Australia), non-f. wr. & activist
Eliza Fay (1755 or 1756–1816, England/India), correspondent
Madame de La Fayette (1634–1693, France), nv.
Samira Fazal (living, Pakistan), screenwriter & pw.
Carmen Febres-Cordero de Ballén (1829–1893, Ecuador), wr. & poet
Astrid Stampe Feddersen (1852–1930, Denmark), wr. & activist
Etta Federn (1883–1951, Austria/Austria-Hungary), wr. & translator
Elaine Feeney (living, Ireland), nv. & pw.
Klára Fehér (1919–1996, Hungary), nv. & ch. wr.
Leslie Feinberg (1949–2014, United States), wr. & activist
Elaine Feinstein (1930–2019, England), poet, nv. & translator
Else Feldmann (1884–1942, Austria/Austria-Hungary), pw., poet & nv.
Stéphanie Félicité, comtesse de Genlis (1746–1830, France), nv., pw. & ch. wr.
Mary Fels (1863–1953, Germany/United States), wr. & ed.
Zuo Fen (左芬, c. 255–300, China), poet
Feng Yuanjun (冯沅君, 1900–1974, China), wr. & scholar
Edna Ferber (1885–1968, United States), nv. & pw.
Kate Lee Ferguson (1841–1928, United States), nv., poet & composer
Fanny Fern (1811–1872, United States), fiction & ch. wr.
María Luisa Fernández (1870–1938, Chile), feminist wr. & poet
Marian Lopez Fernandez-Cao (b. 1964, Spain), art wr. & academic
Roberta Fernández (living, United States), nv., scholar & critic
Chitra Fernando (1935–1998, Sri Lanka), ch. wr. & academic
Vera Ferra-Mikura (1923–1997, Austria/Austria-Hungary), ch. wr.
Elena Ferrante (b. 1943, Italy), nv.
María del Carme Ribé i Ferré (1920–1991, Spain), nv. & autobiographer
Rosario Ferré (1938–2016, United States), nv., poet & biographer
Maria Eugenia Vaz Ferreira (1875–1924, Uruguay), poet & educator
Julia Ferrer (1925–1995, Peru), poet & wr.
Susan Edmonstoune Ferrier (1782–1854, Scotland), nv.
Diana Ferrus (b. 1953, South Africa), poet in Afrikaans & English
Laura Dayton Fessenden (1852–1924, United States), wr.
Maria Fetherstonhaugh (1847–1918, England), nv.
Tina Fey (b. 1970, United States), screenwriter & autobiographer
Vera Feyder (b. 1949, Belgium/France), poet & nv.
Ilia Fibiger (1817–1867, Denmark), pw. & fiction wr.
Mathilde Fibiger (1830–1872, Denmark), wr. on women's rights
Dorothea de Ficquelmont (1804–1863, Russia/Austria/Austria-Hungary), diarist in French
Mrs. E. M. Field (1856–1940, Ireland), nv. & literary critic
Michael Field, the pseudonym of Katharine Bradley (1846–1914, England) and Edith Cooper (1862–1913, England), poets, pw.
Rachel Field (1894–1942, United States), nv., poet & ch. wr.
Helen Fielding (b. 1958, England), nv.
Sarah Fielding (1710–1768, England), nv.
Jennie Fields (b. 1953, United States), nv.
Celia Fiennes (1662–1741, England), travel wr.
Fanny Carrión de Fierro (b. 1936, Ecuador), poet, critic & academic
Eva Figes (1932–2012, Germany/England), nv., critic & feminist
N. P. Figgis (1939–2014, Ireland/Wales), archaeologist
Sia Figiel (b. 1967, Serbia), poet & nv.
Vera Figner (1852–1942, Russia/Soviet Union), mem. & political biographer
Margita Figuli (1909–1995, Czechoslovakia/Czech Republic/Slovakia), social & ch. wr.
Amanda Filipacchi (b. 1957, France/United States), nv.
Lyudmila Filipova (b. 1977, Bulgaria), nv. & col.
Zlata Filipović (b. 1980, Bosnia-Herzegovina/Ireland), child war diarist
Adelaide Filleul, Marquise de Souza-Botelho (1761–1836, France), nv.
Clara Filleul (1822–1878, France), ch. wr. & painter
Anne Finch (1661–1720, England), poet
Annie Finch (b. 1956, United States), poet, translator & critic
Anne Fine (b. 1947, England), wr.
Manuela Fingueret (1945–2013, Argentina), poet, nv. & es.
Ida Fink (1921–2011, Poland/Israel), Hc. wr.
Nikky Finney (b. 1957, United States), poet
Steinunn Finnsdóttir (c. 1640 – c. 1710, Iceland), poet
Carmen Firan (b. 1958, Romania/United States), poet, fiction wr. & pw.
Caroline Auguste Fischer (1764–1842, Germany), wr. & rights activist
Margery Fish (1892–1969, England), gardening wr.
Ann Fisher (1719–1778, England), grammarian
Carrie Fisher (1956–2016, United States), nv., actor & screenwriter
Catherine Fisher (b. 1957, Wales), wr. & broadcaster
Lala Fisher (1872–1929, Australia), poet & editor
M. F. K. Fisher (1908–1992, United States), food wr.
Wirydianna Fiszerowa (1761–1826, Poland), mem.
Fitnat Hanım (died 1780, Turkey/Ottoman Empire), poet
Sarah Mary Fitton (c. 1796–1874, Ireland), wr. & botanist
Barbara Fitzgerald (1911–1982, Ireland/England), nv.
Kitty Fitzgerald (b. 1946, Ireland/England), nv., poet & pw.
Mary Anne Fitzgerald (living, South Africa/England), political wr.
Penelope Fitzgerald (1916–2000, England), nv., poet & biographer
Theodora FitzGibbon (1916–1991, Ireland), cookery wr.
Louise Fitzhugh (1928–1974, United States), ch. wr. & illustrator
Becca Fitzpatrick (b. 1979, United States), nv.
Kathleen Fitzpatrick (1905–1990), historian, biographer & critic
Marie-Louise Fitzpatrick (b. 1962, Ireland), ch. wr. & illustrator
Ellen Fitzsimon (1805–1883, Ireland), poet
Fannie Flagg (b. 1944, United States), screenwriter & nv.
Jane Flanders (1940–2001, United States), poet
Marieluise Fleißer (1901–1974, Germany), pw.
Marjorie Fleming (1803–1811, Scotland), child diarist & poet
Kate Fleron (1909–2006, Denmark), wr. & resistance fighter
Beryl Fletcher (1938–2018, New Zealand), nv.
Jane Ada Fletcher (1870–1956, Australia), nature & ch. wr.
Lisa Anne Fletcher (1844-1905, United States), poet, correspondent
Mary Bosanquet Fletcher (1739–1850, England), religious wr.
Penelope Fletcher (b. 1988, England), YA & fantasy wr.
Zénaïde Fleuriot (1829–1890, France), nv.
Pierrette Fleutiaux (1941–2019, France), fiction wr.
Lynn Flewelling (b. 1958, United States), nv.
Lina Flor (1914–1976, Philippines), fiction & scriptwriter
Leona Florentino (1849–1884, Philippines), poet
Malva Flores (b. 1961, Mexico), poet, fiction wr. & es.
Paulina Flores (b. 1988, Chile), fiction wr.
Nísia Floresta (1810–1885, Brazil/France), poet & feminist
Angela Flournoy (living, United States), nv.
Pat Flower (1914–1977, Australia), stage & TV pw. & nv.
Tui Flower (1925–2017, New Zealand), food wr.
Emilie Flygare-Carlén (1807–1892, Sw.), nv.
Carol Houlihan Flynn (b. 1945, United States), academic, critic & fiction wr.
Elizabeth Gurley Flynn (1890–1964, United States), political wr. & activist
Gillian Flynn (b. 1971, United States), nv. & screenwriter

Fo–Fu
Marnie Fogg (living, England), fashion wr.
Éva Földes (1914–1981, Hungary), wr. & Hc. survivor
Jolán Földes (1902–1963, Hungary), nv.
Mária Földes (1925–1976, Romania), pw. in Hungarian and Hc. survivor
Winifred Foley (1914–2009, England), autobiographer
Mary Alice Fonda (1837–1897, United States), musician, linguist, wr., critic
Maria Assumpció Soler i Font (1913–2004, Spain), wr. & col. in Catalan
Brigitte Fontaine (b. 1939, France), wr. & singer
Moderata Fonte (1555–1592, Italy), feminist & poet; The Worth of Women
Pascale Fonteneau (b. 1963, France/Belgium), nv. & wr. in French
Philippa Foot (1920–2010, England), philosopher
Donna Foote (b. 1950, United States), non-f. wr.
Mary Hallock Foote (1847–1938, United States), nv.
Mary Hannay Foott (1846–1918, Australia), poet & editor
Alaíde Foppa (1914 – c. 1980, Spain), poet
Curdella Forbes (living, Jamaica), science fiction wr.
Frances Forbes-Robertson (1866–1956, United Kingdom), nv.
Esther Forbes (1891–1967, United States), nv. & ch. wr.
Charlotte-Rose de Caumont de La Force (1654–1724, France), nv. & poet
Margot Forde (1935–1992, New Zealand), botanist & taxonomist
Patricia Forde (b. c. 1960, Ireland), ch. wr.
Honor Ford-Smith (b. 1951, Canada/Newfoundland), pw., scholar & poet
Meta Forkel-Liebeskind (1765–1853, Germany), academic
Aminatta Forna (b. 1964, Scotland), wr.
María Irene Fornés (1930–2018, Cuba/United States), pw.
Francesca Forrellad (1927–2013, Spain), wr. in Catalan
Lluïsa Forrellad (1927–2018, Spain), nv. & pw. in Spanish & Catalan
Anne Marie Forrest (living, Ireland), nv.
Mabel Forrest (1872–1935, Australia), nv. & poet
Veronica Forrest-Thomson (1947–1975, Scotland), poet & critic
Ellen Forrester (1823–1883, Ireland), poet
Viviane Forrester (1825–1913, France), es., nv. & critic
Olga Forsh (1873–1961, Russia/Soviet Union), novelist, pw. & mem.
Thelma Forshaw (1923–1995, Australia), fiction wr. & reviewer
Tua Forsström (b. 1947, Finland), poet in Swedish
Margaret Forster (1938–2016, England), nv. & biographer
Mary Forster (c. 1620–1687, England), Quaker polemicist
Michelanne Forster (b. 1953, New Zealand), pw. & scriptwriter
Jessie Forsyth (1847/49 – 1937, England/United States/Australia), temperance advocate
Gertrud von Le Fort (1876–1971, Germany), nv., poet & es.
Laudomia Forteguerri (1515–1555, Italy), poet
Susana Fortes (b. 1959, Spain), nv. & col.
Elena Fortún (1886–1952, Spain), ch. wr.
Dion Fortune (Violet Mary Firth, 1890–1946, Wales), nv. & wr.
Mary Fortune (c. 1833–1911, Australia), crime wr.
E. M. Foster (fl. late 18th – early 19th centuries, England), nv.
Hannah Webster Foster (1758–1840, United States), nv.
Lydia Mary Foster (1867–1943, Ireland), social writer & poet
Lynn Foster (1914–1985, Australia), pw. & nv.
Corlia Fourie (b. 1944, South Africa), fiction & ch. wr. in Afrikaans
Carolina Amor de Fournier (1908–1993, Mexico), biographer & medical wr.
Dorothy Fowler (living, New Zealand), nv.
Harriet Putnam Fowler (1842–1901, United States), wr., poet
Karen Joy Fowler (b. 1950, United States), fiction wr.
Aileen Fox (1907–2005, England), archaeologist
Mamita Fox (b. 1943, Curaçao), autobiographer
Biancamaria Frabotta (1946–2022, Italy), poet & critic
Esther G. Frame (1840–1920, United States}, autobiographer
Janet Frame (1924–2004, New Zealand), fiction & YA wr. & autobiographer
Isabel Franc (b. 1955, Spain), fiction wr. & es.
Marie de France (fl. 12th century, France), poet in Anglo-Norman
Ruth France (1913–1968, New Zealand), poet & nv.
Annie Francé-Harrar (1886–1971, Austria/Austria-Hungary), wr. & scientist
Lorraine Francis (b. 1958, Ireland), ch. wr.
M. E. Francis (1859–1930, Ireland/England), nv.
Suzanne Francis (b. 1959, England), fantasy wr.
Julia Franck (b. 1970, Germany), fiction wr. and es.
Veronica Franco (1546–1591, Italy), poet
Jocelyne François (b. 1933, France), nv.
Louise von François (1817–1893, Germany), nv.
Justine Frangouli-Argyris (b. 1959, Greece), fiction wr. & biographer
Anne Frank (Anna, 1929–1945, Netherlands), diarist & Hc. victim; The Diary of a Young Girl
Lone Frank (b. 1966, Denmark), science wr.
Miles Franklin (1879–1954, Australia), feminist wr.
Abby Franquemont (b. 1972, United States), wr.
Rebecca Fransway (b. 1953, United States), wr. & poet
Agnes Franz (1794–1843, German), writer
Marie-Louise von Franz (1915–1998, Germany/Switzerland), psychologist
Antonia Fraser (b. 1932, England), nv. & biographer
Bashabi Fraser (b. 1954, India), non-f. and ch. wr., poet, and translator
Pauline Fréchette (1889-1943, Canada), poet, dr., jour.; nun
Kirstine Frederiksen (1845–1903, Denmark), educationist & activist
Marianne Fredriksson (1927–2007, Sweden), nv.
Lynn Freed (living, South Africa), fiction wr. & es. in English
Gillian Freeman (1929–2019, England), nv. & pw.
Mary Eleanor Wilkins Freeman (1852–1930, United States), fiction wr.
Celia de Fréine (b. 1948, Ireland), poet, pw. & librettist
Espido Freire (b. 1974, Spain), nv.
Raquel Freire (b. 1973, Paraguay), screenwriter, nv. & film director
Anna Freixas (b. 1946, Spain), wr. & academic
Laura Freixas (b. 1958, Spain), fiction wr. & col.
Elizabeth Wynne Fremantle (1778–1857, England), diarist
Anne French (b. 1956, New Zealand), poet
Dawn French (b. 1957, Wales/England), wr. & comedian
Katy French (1983–2007, Ireland), writer & model
Lucy Virginia French (1825–1881, United States), wr.
Marilyn French (1929–2009, United States), feminist wr. & academic
Tana French (b. 1973, United States/Ireland), nv. & actor
Mariana Frenk-Westheim (1898–2004, Mexico), poet & Hispanist
Maud Frère (1923–1979, Belgium), fiction & ch. wr. in French
Patricia Fresen (b. 1940, South Africa), religious wr. in English
Yvonne du Fresne (1929–2011, New Zealand), fiction wr. & radio pw.
Anna Freud (1895–1982, As/England), psychoanalyst
Milagros Frías (b. 1955, Spain), nv. & critic
Maikki Friberg (1861–1927, Finland), educator & peace activist
Betty Friedan (1921–2006, United States), wr., activist & feminist
Violeta Friedman (1930–2000, Russia/Spain), wr. & Hc. survivor
Inger Frimansson (b. 1944, Sweden), poet & fiction & ch. wr.
Barbara Frischmuth (b. 1941, Austria/Austria-Hungary), nv., poet & pw.
Marianne Fritz (1948–2007, Austria/Austria-Hungary), nv.
Francisca Praguer Fróes (1872–1931, Brazil), health wr. & activist
Gayleen Froese (b. 1972, Canada/Newfoundland), nv. & songwriter
Eva Margareta Frölich (1650–1692, Sweden), wr.
Elena Frolova (b. 1969, Latvia/Russia), songwriter & poet
Bella Fromm (1890–1972, Germany/United States), wartime journalist
Katarina Frostenson (b. 1953, Sweden), poet
Ruth Frow (1922–2008, England), wr. & historian
Linda Frum (b. 1963, Canada/Newfoundland), wr. & politician
Joan Mary Fry (1862–1955, England), Quaker social wr.
Susanna M. D. Fry (1841–1920, United States), wr.
Agnes Moore Fryberger (1868–1939, United States), music wr.
Camilla Frydan (1887–1949, Austria/Austria-Hungary), lyricist & musician
Fu Shanxiang (傅善祥, 1833–1864, China), scholar
Fu Tianlin (傅天琳, b. 1946, China), poet
Gloria Fuertes (1917–1998, Spain), poet & ch. wr.
Lisa Fugard (living, South Africa/United States), fiction wr. & actor
Sheila Meiring Fugard (b. 1932, England/South Africa), fiction wr. & pw.
Mihona Fujii (藤井みほな, b. 1974, Japan), manga creator
Kaori Fujino (藤野可織, b. 1980, Japan), fiction wr.
Kazuko Fujita (藤田和子, b. 1957, Japan), manga creator
Cocoa Fujiwara (藤原ここあ, 1983–2015, Japan), manga creator
Hiro Fujiwara (藤原ヒロ, b. 1981, Japan), manga creator
Yvonne K. Fulbright (living, Iceland/United States), sexologist
Anne Fuller (died 1790, Ireland), nv.
Janice Moore Fuller (b. 1951, United States), poet & pw.
Claire Fuller (b. 1967, England), nv.
Alexandra Fuller (b. 1969, Zimbabwe/United States), mem. & nv.
Margaret Fuller (1810–1850, United States), feminist
Mary Eliza Fullerton (1868–1946, Australia), feminist poet, fiction wr. & col.
Alice Fulton (b. 1952, United States), wr. & poet
Catherine Fulton (1829–1919, England/New Zealand), diarist & philanthropist
Cornelia Funke (b. 1958, Germany), ch. wr.
Bilkisu Funtuwa (living, Nigeria), nv.
Huarui Furen (花蕊夫人, 940–976, China), poet
Alice Furlong (1866–1946, Ireland), story wr. & poet
Eva Furnari (b. 1948, Italy/Brazil), ch. wr. & illustrator
Füruzan (b. 1932, Turkey/Ottoman Empire), fiction & non-f. wr.
Felícia Fuster (1921–2012, Spain), poet in Catalan & painter
Luisa Futoransky (b. 1939, Argentina), poet, nv. & academic

G

Ga–Gl
Diana Gabaldon (b. 1952, United States), fiction wr.
Patrícia Gabancho (1952–2017, Argentina/Spain), wr. in Catalan
Anneli Ute Gabanyi (b. 1942, Romania/Germany), critic & philologist
Ekaterine Gabashvili (1851–1938, Georgia (Caucasus)), nv. & feminist
Dora Gabe (1888–1983, Bulgaria), poet & travel wr.
Cherubina de Gabriak (1887–1928, Russia/Soviet Union), poet
Belén Gache (b. 1960, Argentina/Spain), nv. & electronic wr.
Emma Gad (1852–1921, Denmark), wr. & pw.
Gertrude Gaffney (?-1959, Ireland), col.
Maureen Gaffney (b. 1947, Ireland), psychologist
Frances Dana Barker Gage (1808–1884, United States), wr. & poet
Nina Gagen-Torn (1900–1986, Russia/Soviet Union), poet & ethnographer
Eva Roe Gaggin (1879–1966, United States), ch. wr.
Marie-Louise Gagneur (1832–1902, France), fiction wr., es. & activist
Jeannine Hall Gailey (b. 1973, United States), poet & critic
Abby Gaines (living, New Zealand), nv.
Sigri Mitra Gaïni (b. 1975, Faroe Islands), poet & educator
Carmen Martín Gaite (1925–2000, Spain), fiction wr., es. & screenwriter
Mary Gaitskill (b. 1954, United States), es. & fiction wr.
Nora Gal (1912–1991, Russia/Soviet Union), critic & translation theorist
Ana Galán (b. 1964, Spain/United States), ch. wr. & humorist
Rhea Galanaki (b. 1947, Greece), fiction wr., es. & poet
Georgie Starbuck Galbraith (1909–1980, United States), poet
Rosa Galcerán (1917–2015, Spain), poet & cartoonist
Ona Galdikaitė (1898–1990, Lithuania/Germany), poet & nun
Kate Gale (b. 1965, United States), poet & librettist
Zona Gale (1874–1938, United States), nv. & pw.
Azucena Galettini (b. 1981, Argentina), wr.
Erzsébet Galgóczi (1930–1989, Hungary), fiction wr. & pw.
Adela Galiana (1825 – late 19th/early 20th century, Spain), wr.
Beatriz Galindo (c. 1465–1534, Sp.), Latinist & educator
Hermila Galindo (1886–1954, Mexico), political wr.
María Galindo (b. 1964, Bolivia), psychologist
Katherine Gallagher (b. 1935, Argentina), poet
Kathleen Gallagher (b. 1957, New Zealand), pw., poet & nv.
Margaret Gallagher (living, Ireland/England), gender researcher
Miriam Gallagher (b. 1940, Ireland), pw.
Rhian Gallagher (b. 1961, New Zealand), poet
Tess Gallagher (b. 1943, United States), poet, nv. & pw.
Fatima Gallaire (1944–2020, Algeria/France), pw. & fiction wr.
Mavis Gallant (1922–2014, Canada/Newfoundland), fiction wr., pw. & es. in French
Sara Gallardo (1931–1988, Argentina), fiction wr.
Menna Gallie (1919–1990, Wales), nv. & translator
Karina Galvez (b. 1964, Ecuador), poet
María Rosa de Gálvez (1768–1806, Spain), poet & pw.
Jeanne Galzy (1883–1977, France), nv. & biographer
Joana da Gama (c. 1520–1586, Portugal), nun & wr. on aphorisms
Veronica Gambara (1485–1550, Italy), poet & politician
Griselda Gambaro (b. 1928, Argentina), fiction wr., pw. & es.
Mary Ninde Gamewell (1858–1947, United States), missionary & wr.
Gangadevi (fl. 14th century, India), poet & princess
Alisa Ganieva (b. 1985, Russia), fiction wr. & es.
Petina Gappah (b. 1971, Zimbabwe), fiction wr.
Anne-Marie Garat (b. 1946, France), nv.
Nicole Garay (1873–1928, Panama), poet
Carolina Garcia-Aguilera (b. 1949, Cuba/United States), fiction wr. in English
Cristina García (b. 1958, Cuba/United States), nv.
R. S. A. Garcia (living, Trinidad), science fiction wr.
María Esther García López (b. 1948, Spain), poet, wr.
Jane Gardam (b. 1928, England), fiction & ch. wr.
Delphine Gardey (b. 1967, France), non-f. wr.
Marguerite Gardiner, Countess of Blessington (1789–1849, Ireland), nv. & col.
Elizabeth Anne Gard'ner (1858–1926, Sweden/New Zealand), domestic science wr.
Malwina Garfeinowa-Garska (1870–1932, Poland), nv. & es.
Mridula Garg (b. 1938, India), fiction wr. & es.
Francesca Gargallo (1956–2022, Italy/Mexico), poet & nv.
Mariam Garikhuli (1883–1960, Georgia (Caucasus)/Soviet Union), nv. & ch. wr.
Doris Pilkington Garimara (1937–2014, Australia), nv.
Tatiana Garmash-Roffe (b. 1959, Soviet Union/Russia), nv.
Helen Garner (b. 1942, Australia), nv. & col.
Constance Garnett (1861–1946, England), translator
Anne F. Garréta (b. 1962, France), nv.
Carlota Garrido de la Peña (1870–1958, Argentina), journalist, wr.
Fanny Garrido (1846–1917, Spain), nv. & col.
Francisca Herrera Garrido (1869–1950, Spain), poet & nv. in Galician
Marissa Garrido (1926–2021, Mexico), telenovela pw. & wr. 
Harriet E. Garrison (1848–1930, United States), medical wr.
Elena Garro (c. 1916–1998, Mexico), screenwriter & fiction wr.
Dorothy Garrod (1892–1968, England), archaeologist
Amy Jacques Garvey (1895–1973, Jamaica), journalist & activist
María Luisa Garza (1887–1980, Mexico), nv.
Caroline Leigh Gascoigne (1813–1883, England), poet & nv.
Elizabeth Gaskell (1810–1865, England), nv.; Cranford
Whitney Gaskell (b. 1972, United States), nv.
Catherine Gaskin (1929–2009, Australia), nv.
Valérie de Gasparin (1813–1894, Switzerland), social wr. in French
Brunella Gasperini (1918–1979, Italy), nv.
Nathalie Gassel (b. 1964, Belgium), feminist wr.
Carmen Bernos de Gasztold (1919–1995, France), poet & nun
Liudmila Gatagova (living, Soviet Union/Russia), historian & es.
Zélia Gattai (1916–2008, Brazil), nv. & ch. wr.
Margaret Gatty (1809–1873, England), ch. wr. & biologist
Delores Gauntlett (b. 1949, Jamaica), poet
Judith Gautier (1845–1917, France), poet & nv.
Anna Gavalda (b. 1970, France), nv.
Jamila Gavin (b. 1941, India/England), fiction & ch. wr.
Roxane Gay (b. 1974, United States), wr., ed. & social commentator
Sophie Gay (1776–1852, France), nv. & librettist
Alessia Gazzola (b. 1982, Italy), nv.
Béatrice Lalinon Gbado (living, Benin), ch. wr.
Ivone Gebara (b. 1944, Brazil), philosopher & nun
Miriam Gebhardt (b. 1962, Germany), historian
Pauline Gedge (b. 1945, Canada/Newfoundland), nv.
Vera Gedroits (1870–1932, Russia/Soviet Union), medical wr.
Maggie Gee (b. 1948, England), nv.
Angela Gegg (b. 1979, Belize), wr. & artist
Luisa Geisler (b. 1991, Brazil), fiction wr.
Naira Gelashvili (b. 1947, Georgia (Caucasus)), nv. & activist
Edith Mary Gell (1860–1944, England), wr. & activist
Martha Gellhorn (1908–1998, United States), nv, travel wr. & journalist
Charley Genever (living, England), poet
Stéphanie Félicité, comtesse de Genlis (1746–1830, France), nv. & education theorist
Empress Genmei (元明天皇, 660–721, Japan), monarch & poet
Louise Boije af Gennäs (b. 1971, Sweden), nv.
Catherine of Genoa (St Catherine, 1447–1510, Italy), wr. & mystic
Doris Gentile (1894–1972, Australia), fiction wr.
Sulari Gentill (living, Australia), fiction wr.
Elizabeth George (b. 1949, United States), mystery nv.
Ella M. George (1850-1938, United States), non-f. wr. & newspaper editor
Frances Shayle George (1828–1890, England/New Zealand), poet, es. & educator
Margaret George (b. 1943, United States), nv.
Nina George (b. 1973, Germany), wr.
Danielle Legros Georges (living, Haiti/United States), poet, es. & academic
Rosemonde Gérard (1871–1953, France), poet & pw.
Ágnes Gergely (b. 1933, Hungary), poet & nv.
Ida Gerhardt (1905–1997, Netherlands), classicist & poet
Doris Gercke (b. 1937, Germany), nv.
Sylvie Germain (b. 1954, France), nv. & es.
Teolinda Gersão (b. 1940, Portugal), fiction wr.
Marina Gershenovich (b. 1960, Russia/Germany), poet
Karen Gershon (1923–1993, Germany/England), poet & fiction & non-f. wr.
Elfriede Gerstl (1932–2009, Austria/Austria-Hungary), poet, fiction wr. & es.
Amy Gerstler (b. 1956, United States), poet
María Elena Gertner (1932–2013, Chile), poet, nv. & screenwriter
Gertrude the Great (1256 – c. 1302, Germany), saint & mystic in Latin
Masha Gessen (b. 1967, Soviet Union/United States), political wr.
Ragnheiður Gestsdóttir (b. 1953, Iceland), ch. wr.
Geum Hee (금희, b. 1979, Korea), wr.
Yi Geun-hwa (이근화, b. 1976, Korea), poet
Marie Gevers (1893–1975, Belgium), nv. in French
Amélie Gex (1835–1883, France), poet & wr. also in Provençal
Zarah Ghahramani (b. 1981, Iran/Persia/Australia), mem.
Randa Ghazy (b. 1987, Egypt/Italy), wr.
Salima Ghezali (b. 1958, Algeria), wr. & activist
Sagarika Ghose (b. 1964, India), col. & nv.
Maureen Gibbon (living, United States), fiction wr.
June & Jennifer Gibbons (b. 1963, Jennifer died 1993, Wales), fiction wr.
Kaye Gibbons (b. 1960, United States), nv.
Stella Gibbons (1902–1989, England), nv. & short story wr.
Angelica Gibbs (1908–1955, United States), fiction wr. & col.
Ivy Gibbs (c. 1886–1966, Australia/New Zealand), poet & ch. wr.
May Gibbs (1877–1969, Australia), ch. wr. & illustrator
Doris Gibson (1910–2008, Peru), political wr.
Suzanne Giese (1946–2012, Denmark), wr. & rights activist
Eve Gil (b. 1968, Mexico), fiction wr. & poet
Ruth Gilbert (1917–2016, New Zealand), poet
Elizabeth Gilbert (b. 1969, United States), fiction & non-f. wr.
Annie Somers Gilchrist (1841–1912, United States), fiction, non-f. wr. & poet
Ellen Gilchrist (b. 1935, United States), fiction wr. & poet
Betty Gilderdale (1923–2021, New Zealand), ch. wr.
Annabel Giles (b. 1959, Wales), nv. & broadcaster
Olivia Aroha Giles (living, New Zealand), ch. & fiction wr.
María Esther Gilio (1922–2011, Uruguay), biographer & col.
Elizabeth Gilligan (1962–2017, United States), nv.
Ruth Gilligan (b. 1988, Ireland), nv. & academic
Charlotte Perkins Gilman (1860–1935, United States), sociologist & poet
Florence Magruder Gilmore (1881–1945), religious wr., nv., translator
Mary Gilmore (1865–1962, Australia), poet & col.
Beryl Gilroy (1924–2001, Guyana), nv.
Marija Gimbutas (1921–1994, Lithuania/United States), archaeologist & anthropologist
Ruby Langford Ginibi (1934–2001, Australia), historian & non-f. wr.
Zuzanna Ginczanka (1917–1945, Poland), poet & Hc. victim
Lidiya Ginzburg (1902–1990, Russia/Soviet Union), critic & historian
Natalia Ginzburg (1916–1991, Italy), fiction & social wr.
Yevgenia Ginzburg (1904–1977, Russia/Soviet Union), mem. & political prisoner
Cinzia Giorgio (b. 1975, Italy), nv. & academic
Marosa di Giorgio (1932–2004, Uruguay), poet & nv.
Nikki Giovanni (b. 1943, United States), poet, wr. & activist
Zinaida Gippius (1869–1945, Russia/Soviet Union), poet, pw. & nv.
Delphine de Girardin (1804–1855, France), es., nv. & pw.
Banira Giri (1946–2021, Nepal), poet & wr.
Blanche Girouard (1898–1940, Ireland/England), fiction wr.
Hallgerður Gísladóttir (1952–2007, Iceland), ethnologist & poet
Þórdís Gísladóttir (b. 1965, Iceland), ch. wr., poet & nv.
Moraa Gitaa (living, Kenya), fiction & non-f. wr.
Anca Giurchescu (1930–2015, Romania), researcher
Stanka Gjurić (b. 1956, Yu/Canada/Newfoundland), poet & es.
Asiimwe Deborah GKashugi (living, Uganda), pw. & performer
Evi Gkotzaridis (living, Greece), historian
Diane Glancy (b. 1941, United States), poet, nv. & pw.
Margo Glantz (b. 1930, Mexico), fiction wr., autobiographer & es.
Henny Glarbo (1884–1955, Denmark), archivist
Ellen Glasgow (1873–1945, United States), nv.
Maude Glasgow (1876–1955, Ireland/United States), preventive medicine wr.
Susan Glaspell (1876–1948, United States), nv. & pw.
Julia Glass (b. 1956, United States), nv.
Madeline Gleason (1903–1979, United States), poet & pw.
Esther Glen (1881–1940, New Zealand), ch. wr., nv. & activist
Mar Gómez Glez (b. 1977, Spain), pw. & nv.
Patricia Glinton-Meicholas (b. 1950, Bahamas), wr., critic & educator
Barbara Gloudon (1935–2022, Jamaica), journalist, pw.
Louise Glück (b. 1943, United States), poet
Glückel of Hameln (c. 1646–1724), diarist in Yiddish

Gm–Gy
Anna Gmeyner (1902–1991, Austria/Austria-Hungary/England), nv. & scriptwriter in German & English
Christine Adjahi Gnimagnon (b. 1945, Benin), wr.
Elisabetta Gnone (b. 1965, Italy), ch. wr.
Charlotte Godley (1821–1907, Wales/New Zealand), correspondent
Gail Godwin (b. 1937, United States), fiction & non-f. wr. & librettist
Helga Goetze (1922–2008, Germany), wr., poet and painter
Germaine Goetzinger (b. 1947, Luxembourg), historian, linguist & educator
Katerina Gogou (1940–1993, Greece), poet, wr. & actor
Christiane Gohl (b. 1958, Germany), ch. wr.
Namita Gokhale (b. 1956, India), fiction & non-f. wr.
Hawa Jande Golakai (b. 1979, Liberia), wr. & scientist
Nora Gold (b. 1952, Canada/Newfoundland), nv.
Kaarina Goldberg (b. 1956, Finland/Austria/Austria-Hungary), ch. wr. & col.
Natalie Goldberg (b. 1948, United States), non-f. wr.
Goldie Goldbloom (b. 1964, Australia), fiction wr.
Marita Golden (b. 1950, United States), nv. & non-f. wr.
Kate De Goldi (b. 1959, New Zealand), ch. & fiction wr.
Amy Goldin (1926–1978, United States), art critic
Emma Goldman (1869–1940, Lithuania/United States), anarchist
Júlia Goldman (b. 1974, Hungary), genre nv. & mathematician
Anna Goldsworthy (b. 1974, Australia), wr., teacher & pianist
Nilüfer Göle (b. 1953, Turkey/Ottoman Empire/France), academic
Padma Gole (1913–1998, India), poet
Alenka Goljevšček (1933–2017, Yugoslavia/Slovenia), mythologist & pw.
Claire Goll (1890–1977, Germany), poet & nv. in German & French
Berta Golob (b. 1932, Yugoslavia/Slovenia), fiction & non-f. wr. & poet
Anne Golon (1921–2017, France/Canada/Newfoundland), nv.
Estela Golovchenko (b. 1963, Uruguay), pw. & actor
Luísa Costa Gomes (b. 1954, Portugal), librettist, nv. & pw.
Jewelle Gomez (b. 1948, United States), poet, critic & pw.
Lupe Gómez (b. 1972, Spain), wr. in Galician
Petronila Angélica Gómez (1883–1971, Dominica), feminist wr.
Eloísa Gómez-Lucena (living, Spain), non-f. wr.
Gong Ji-young (공지영, b. 1963, Korea), nv.
Gong Sun-ok (공선옥, b. 1963, Korea), fiction & non-f. wr.
Ana Maria Gonçalves (b. 1970, Brazil), nv.
Olga Gonçalves (1929–2004, Portugal), poet & nv.
Sophie Gonzales (b. 1993, Argentina), YA wr.
Aida González (b. 1962, Panama), fiction wr. & physician
Aurelia Castillo de González (1842–1920, Cuba), prose wr. & poet
Betina Gonzalez (b. 1972, Argentina), fiction wr.
Clotilde González de Fernández (1880–1935, Argentina), non-f. wr. & educator
Maria Lluïsa Borràs i Gonzàlez (1931–2010, Spain), art wr.
Dulce María González (1958–2015, Mexico), fiction wr., poet & academic
Maria Teresa Maia Gonzalez (b. 1958, Portugal), ch. & YA wr.
Enriqueta González Rubín (1832–1877, Spain), novelist in Asturian
Lorna Goodison (b. 1947, Jamaica), poet & fiction wr.
Allegra Goodman (b. 1967, United States), fiction wr.
Lavinia Stella Goodwin (1833–1911, United States), wr. & educator
Jeanne Goosen (1938–2020, South Africa), poet & fiction & ch. wr. in Afrikaans
Belén Gopegui (b. 1963, Spain), nv.
Natalya Gorbanevskaya (1936–2013, Soviet Union/France), poet & activist
Viviana Gorbato (1950–2005, Argentina), wr. & academic
Nadine Gordimer (1923–2014, South Africa), nv. & pw.; 1991 Nobel Prize in Literature
Alice Mary Gordon (c. 1855–1929, England), wr.
Caroline Gordon (1895–1981, United States), nv. & critic
Jaimy Gordon (b. 1944, United States), nv.
Lyndall Gordon (b. 1941, South Africa/England), biographer
Mary Gordon (b. 1949, United States), fiction & non-f. wr.
Sheila Gordon (1927–2013, South Africa/United States), fiction wr.
Catherine Gore (1799–1861, England), nv. & pw.
Eva Gore-Booth (1870–1926, Ireland/England), poet, pw. & activist
Alisz Goriupp (1894–1979, Russia/Hungary), media historian & librarian
Nina Gorlanova (b. 1947, Soviet Union/Russia), fiction wr.
Amanda Gorman (b. 1998, United States), poet
Wangui wa Goro (b. (1961, Kenya/England), poet, fiction & non-f. wr. & academic
Angélica Gorodischer (1928–2022, Argentina), fiction wr.
Juana Manuela Gorriti (1818–1892, Argentina/Peru), fiction wr. & politician
Hedwig Gorski (b. 1949, United States), poet & artist
Marthe Gosteli (1917–2017, Switzerland), feminist wr. in German
Anastasia Gosteva (b. 1975, Soviet Union/Russia), nv. & poet
Mamoni Raisom Goswami (1942–2011, India), poet & scholar
Hiromi Goto (b. 1966, Canada/Newfoundland), nv.
Mélanie Gouby (living, France/England), wr., col. & filmmaker
Elizabeth Goudge (1900–1984, England), fiction & ch. wr.
Olympe de Gouges (1748–1793, France), feminist & pw.
Sophie el Goulli (1932–2015, Tunisia), poet & ch. wr.
Neelum Saran Gour (b. 1955, India), fiction & non-f. wr.
Emilie Gourd (1879–1946, Switzerland), political wr. in French
Candy Gourlay (living, Philippines/England), nv. & ch. wr. in English
Marie de Gournay (1565–1645, France), wr. & nv.
Pregs Govender (b. 1960, South Africa), social wr. & col. in English
Katherine Govier (b. 1948, Canada/Newfoundland), fiction wr. & es.
Santhini Govindan (b. 1959, India), ch. wr.
Barbara Gowdy (b. 1950, Canada/Newfoundland), fiction wr.
Iris Gower (1935–2010, Wales), nv.
Kodagina Gowramma (1912–1939, India), wr.
María Goyri (1873–1955, Spain), critic & academic
Hermine de Graaf (1951–2013, Netherlands), nv.
Patricia Grace (b. 1937, New Zealand), fiction & ch. wr.
Annie Ryder Gracey (1836–1908, United States), wr.
Posie Graeme-Evans (b. 1952, England/Australia), nv. & screenwriter
Agnieszka Graff (b. 1970, Poland), feminist wr. & es.
Françoise de Graffigny (1695–1758, France), nv. & pw.
Sue Grafton (1940–2017, United States), nv.
Jorie Graham (b. 1950, United States), poet & academic
Lauren Graham (b. 1967, United States), nv. & actor
Virginia Graham (1910–1993, England), poet & humorist
Winifred Graham (1873–1950, England), nv.
Natalie Grams (b. 1978, Germany), medical wr.
María Josefa García Granados (1796–1848, Guatemala), writer & poet
Reyna Grande (b. 1975, Mexico/United States), nv. & mem. in English
Almudena Grandes (b. 1960, Spain), nv.
Évelyne Grandjean (b. 1939, France), pw., screenwriter & actor
Lucie Grange (1839–1908, France), ed.
Linda Grant (b. 1951, England), nv. & wr.
Sybil Grant (1879–1955, England), wr. & artist
Lesley Grant-Adamson (b. 1942, England), mystery fiction wr.
Olga Grau (b. 1945, Chile), wr.
Shirley Ann Grau (1929–2020, United States), fiction wr.
Wilhelmina Gravallius (1807–1884, Sweden), nv.
Elsa Grave (1918–2003, Sweden), nv., poet & artist
Clotilde Graves (1863–1932, Ireland/England), pw. & nv.
Lucia Graves (b. 1943, England), wr. & translator
Caroline Gravière (Michel Fleury, 1821–1878, Belgium), nv. & wr. in French
Charlotte E. Gray (1873–1926, US), nv. & religion
Dulcie Gray (1915–2011, Malaysia/England), wr. & actor
Elizabeth Caroline Gray (1800–1887, Scotland), archaeologist & travel wr.
Mary Tenney Gray (1833–1904, United States), col.
Maxwell Gray (1846–1923, England), nv. & poet
Marie Eugenie Delle Grazie (1864–1931, Austria/Austria-Hungary), poet, pw. & nv.
Áine Greaney (b. c. 1962, Ireland/United States), wr.
Alice Stopford Green (1847–1929, Ireland), historian & nationalist
Anna Katharine Green (1846–1935, United States), nv.
Charmaine Papertalk Green (b. 1962, Argentina), poet & artist
Eliza S. Craven Green (1803–1866, Isle of Man), poet
Miriam Green (b. c. 1950, South Africa/England), academic
Paula Green, (b. 1955, New Zealand), poet & ch. wr.
Rosario Green (1941–2017, Mexico), economist & politician
Sarah Green (fl. 1790–1825, Ireland/England), nv.
Bette Greene (1934–2020, United States), ch. & YA wr.
Cordelia A. Greene (1831–1905, United States), non-f. wr.
Frances Nimmo Greene (1867–1937, United States), nv, pw. & wr.
Louisa Lilias Plunket Greene (1833–1891, Ireland), ch. wr.
Jessie Greengrass (b. 1982, England), fiction wr.
Lavinia Greenlaw (b. 1962, England), poet & nv.
Bonnie Greer (b. 1948, England/United States), pw., nv. & critic
Debora Greger (b. 1949, United States), poet & visual artist
Linda Gregg (1942–2019, United States), poet
Simonetta Greggio (b. 1961, Italy), nv. in French
Alyse Gregory (1884–1967, United States/England), suffragist & wr.
Doris Gregory (living, Canada/Newfoundland), wr.
Augusta, Lady Gregory (1852–1932, Ireland), folklorist & pw.
Catharina Regina von Greiffenberg (1633–1694, Austria/Austria-Hungary), poet
Beatrice Greig (1869 – c. 1940s, Canada/Newfoundland/Trinidad), wr. & activist
Virginie Greiner (born 1969), French comic book scriptwriter
Anna Gréki (1931–1966, Algeria), poet, politician & educator
Kate Grenville (b. 1950, Australia), nv. & academic
Elsa Gress (1919–1988, Denmark), es., nv. & pw.
Manuela Gretkowska (b. 1964, Poland), screenwriter & politician
Frances Greville (c. 1724–1789, Ireland/England), poet
Henry Gréville (1842–1902, Russia/France), nv.
Constantia Grierson (c. 1705–1732, Ireland), poet & scholar
Sarah Maria Griffin (b. c. 1988), wr. & poet
Elizabeth Griffith (c. 1727–1793, Ireland), pw., fiction wr. & es.
Ann Griffiths (1776–1805, Wales), poet & hymnist
Delia Grigore (b. 1972, Romania), Romani rights activist
Lydia Grigorieva (b. 1945, Ukraine/England), poet & filmmaker
Tatiana P. Grigorieva (1929–2014, Russia), es. & Japan expert
Martha Grimes (b. 1931, United States), mystery nv.
Angelina Weld Grimke (1880–1958, United States), col. & poet
Charlotte Forten Grimké (1837–1914, United States), anti-slavery activist & poet
Vigdís Grímsdóttir (b. 1953, Iceland), poet, fiction & ch. wr.
Beatrice Grimshaw (1870–1953, Ireland), travel wr.
Charlotte Grimshaw (b. 1968, New Zealand), nv. & col.
Isabella Grinevskaya (1864–1944, Russia/Soviet Union), nv., poet & pw.
Katherine Van Allen Grinnell (1839–1917, United States), wr., lecturer, reformer
Margareta Grip (1538–1586, Sweden), genealogist
Maria Gripe (1923–2007, Sweden), ch. & YA wr.
Eliza Griswold (b. 1973, United States), col. & poet
Hattie Tyng Griswold (1842–1909, United States), wr., poet
Tatiana Gritsi-Milliex (1920–2005, Greece), nv. & col.
Vona Groarke (b. 1964, Ireland/United States), poet & educator
Anne-Lise Grobéty (1949–2010, Switzerland), fiction wr., poet & col. in French
Katarzyna Grochola (b. 1957, Poland), fiction wr. & pw.
Alma De Groen (b. 1941, New Zealand/Australia), pw.
Els de Groen (b. 1949, Netherlands), fiction & non-f. wr.
Lauren Groff (b. 1978, United States), fiction wr.
Paula Grogger (1892–1984, Austria/Austria-Hungary), wr.
Alyona Gromnitskaya (b. 1975, Ukraine), poet & politician
Edith Searle Grossmann (1863–1931, Australia/New Zealand), nv. & educator
Benoîte Groult (1920–2016, France), wr. & activist
Henriette Grové (1922–2009, South Africa), fiction wr. & pw. in Afrikaans
Teji Grover (living, India), poet, fiction wr. & painter
Isabel Grubb (1881–1972, Ireland), Quaker historian
Anna Grue (b. 1957, Denmark), crime wr.
Sara Gruen (b. 1969, Canada/Newfoundland/United States), nv.
Kim Gruenenfelder (living, United States), nv.
Argula von Grumbach (1492 – c. 1555, Germany), religious wr. and poet
Bertha Jane Grundy (1837–1912, England), nv., poet & non-f. wr.
Olga Grushin (b. 1971, Soviet Union/United States), nv. in English
Wioletta Grzegorzewska (b. 1974, Poland), poet & fiction wr.
Gu Taiqing (顾太清, 799 – c. 1877, China), poet
Guan Daosheng (字仲姬, 1262–1319, China), poet, calligrapher & painter
Gloria Guardia (1940–2019, Panama), fiction wr. & critic
Carla Guelfenbein (b. 1959, Chile), nv.
Rosa Guerra (1834–1864, Argentina), educator, journalist, wr.
María José Guerra Palmero (born 1962, Spain), philosopher, non-f. wr., & feminist theorist
Wendy Guerra (b. 1970, Cuba), poet & nv.
Claudine Guérin de Tencin (1682–1749, France), nv. & patron
Soumaya Naamane Guessous (living, Morocco), sociologist & col.
Judith Guest (b. 1936, United States), nv. & screenwriter
Amalia Guglielminetti (1881–1941, Italy), poet & ch. wr.
Margherita Guidacci (1921–1992, Italy), poet & linguist
Beatriz Guido (1924–1988, Argentina), nv. & screenwriter
Pernette Du Guillet (c. 1520–1545, France), poet
Regina Guimarães (b. 1957, Portugal), poet & pw.
Ruth Guimarães (1920–2014, Brazil), fiction wr. & poet
Ursula K. Le Guin (1929–2018, United States), science fiction & ch. wr. & poet
Evelyn May Guinid (b. 1971, Philippines), nv. in Tagalog
Olga Guirao (b. 1956, Spain), nv.
Guji, Princess of Joseon (현주이구지, died 1489, Korea), wr., poet & dancer
Zumrud Gulu-zade (1932–2021, Azerbaijan), philosopher
Nataliya Gumenyuk (b. 1983, Ukraine), journalist, & wr.
Karoline von Günderrode (1780–1806, Germany), poet
Eileen Gunn (b. 1945, United States), fiction wr. & editor
Elizabeth Gunn (1927–2022, United States), nv.
Kirsty Gunn (b. 1960, New Zealand), fiction wr.
Elín Ebba Gunnarsdóttir (b. 1953, Iceland), fiction wr.
Kristín Helga Gunnarsdóttir (b. 1963, Iceland), ch. wr. & nv.
Monica Gunning (b. 1930, Jamaica/United States), ch. wr. & poet
Susannah Gunning (c. 1740–1800, England), nv.
Álfrún Gunnlaugsdóttir (b. 1938, Iceland), nv.
Shusha Guppy (1935–2008, Iran/Persia/England), wr. & singer
Tanika Gupta (b. 1963, England), pw. & screenwriter
Aysel Gürel (1929–2008, Turkey/Ottoman Empire), lyricist
Elena Guro (1877–1913, Russia), futurist wr.
Alice Gurschner (1869–1944, Austria/Austria-Hungary), nv., pw. & poet
Madeleine Gustafsson (b. 1937, Sweden), poet, es. & critic
Aldona Gustas (1932–2022, Lithuania/Germany), poet & illustrator
Rósa Guðmundsdóttir (1795–1855, Iceland), poet
Goya Gutiérrez (b. 1954, Spain), poet & wr.
Rita Cetina Gutiérrez (1846–1908, Mexico), poet & educator
Azmiye Hami Güven (1904–1954, Turkey/Ottoman Empire), nv.
Rosa Guy (1922–2012, Trinidad/United States), fiction & YA wr.
Emma Jane Guyton (1825–1887, England), nv. & editor
Eulalia Guzmán (1890–1985, Mexico), archaeologist & educator
Maria Odulio de Guzman (fl. 20th century), wr. & educator
Viviana Guzmán (b. 1964, Chile), poet & musician
Yaa Gyasi (b. 1989, Ghana/Gold Coast/United States), nv.
Jeon Gyeong-rin (전경린, b. 1962, Korea), nv.
Althea Gyles (1867–1949, Ireland), poet & artist
Thomasine Christine Gyllembourg-Ehrensvärd (1773–1856, Denmark), fiction wr.
Beth Gylys (b. 1964, United States), poet & academic

H

Ha–He
H.D. (Hilda Doolittle) (1886–1961, United States), poet, nv. & mem.
Ha Seong-nan (하성란, b. 1967, Korea), fiction wr.
Meredith Haaf (b. 1983, Germany), wr.
Francisca de Haan (living, Netherlands), social scientist
Hilja Haapala (1877–1958, Finland), wr.
Hella Haasse (1918–2011, Netherlands), nv.
Anna Haava (1864–1957, Estonia), poet & fiction & non-f. wr.
Huzama Habayeb (b. 1965, Palestine/Emirates), fiction wr. & poet
Maria Hack (1777–1844, England), ch. wr.
Marilyn Hacker (b. 1942, United States), poet, translator & critic
Yanna Hadatty (b. 1969, Ecuador/Mexico), fiction wr. & es.
Joumana Haddad (b. 1970, Lebanon), poet & es.
Tessa Hadley (b. 1956, England), nv. & non-f. wr.
Mimi Hafida (b. 1965, Algeria), poet & artist
Jessica Hagedorn (b. 1949, Philippines/United States), poet, pw. & nv.
Lucie Caroline Hager (1853–1903, United States), wr. & poet
Mandy Hager (b. 1960, New Zealand), fiction, non-f., YA and ch. wr.
Moto Hagio (萩尾望都, b. 1949, Japan), manga creator
Lucina Hagman (1853–1946, Finland), feminist & politician
Michitsuna no Haha (道綱, c. 935–995, Japan), diarist
Ida, Countess von Hahn-Hahn (1805–1880, Germany), nv., poet and social wr.
Elizabeth Forsythe Hailey (b. 1938, United States), nv. & pw.
Seo Hajin (서하진, b. 1960, Korea), wr.
Roya Hakakian (b. 1966, Iran/Persia), poet & wr.
Helinä Häkkänen-Nyholm (b. 1971, Finland), psychologist & textbook wr.
Baby Halder (b. 1973, India), autobiographer
Lucretia Peabody Hale (1820–1900, United States), fiction wr. & col.
Gisèle Halimi (1927–2020, Fr/Tunisia), es.
Lady Anne Halkett (1623–1699, England), mem. & es.
Anna Maria Hall (1800–1881, Ireland), nv.
Bernadette Hall (b. 1945, New Zealand), pw. & poet
Megan Hall (b. 1972, South Africa), poet in English
Pip Hall (b. 1971, New Zealand), scriptwriter & actor
Radclyffe Hall (1880–1943, England), nv. & poet
Sarah Hall (b. 1974, England), nv. & poet
Guðný Halldórsdóttir (b. 1954, Iceland), screenwriter
Jean Halley (b. 1967, United States), sociologist
Marion Rose Halpenny (living, England), equestrian
Rosalie Ham (b. 1955, Australia), nv. & pw.
Helvi Hämäläinen (1907–1998, Finland), fiction wr. & poet
Joan Hambidge (b. 1956, South Africa), poet & academic in Afrikaans
Barbara Hambly (b. 1951, United States), nv. & screenwriter
Yasmeen Hameed (b. 1951, Pakistan), poet & educator
Virpi Hämeen-Anttila (b. 1958, Finland), nv. & non-f. wr.
Joan de Hamel (1924–2011, England/New Zealand), ch. wr.
Zaib-un-Nissa Hamidullah (1918–2000, India/Pakistan), poet, fiction & travel wr.
C. J. Hamilton (1841–1935, England/Ireland), pw., poet & ch. wr.
Jane Eaton Hamilton (b. 1954, Canada/Newfoundland), fiction wr. & poet
Jane Hamilton (b. 1957, United States), nv.
Marianne-Caroline Hamilton (1777–1861, Ireland), mem. & artist
Virginia Hamilton (1936–2002, United States), ch. nv.
Anna Hamilton Geete (1848–1913), Swedish translator and biographer
Suheir Hammad (b. 1973, Palestine/United States), poet, pw. & activist
Beatrice Hammer (b. 1963, France), fiction & ch. wr.
Marie Hammer (1907–2002, Denmark), zoologist & entomologist
Irène Hamoir (1906–1994, Belgium), nv. & poet in French
Janie Hampton (b. 1952, England), non-f. wr. & journalist
Susan Hampton (b. 1949, Australia), poet
Han Kang (한강, b. 1970, Korea), fiction wr.
Han Malsook (한말숙, b. 1931, Korea), fiction wr.
Han Moo-sook (한무숙, 1918–1993, Korea), nv.
Amira Hanafi (born 1979), American/Egyptian poet and artist active in electronic literature
Judith Hand (b. 1940, United States), nv., es. & screenwriter
Nathalie Handal (b. 1969, Haiti/United States), poet & pw.
Enrica von Handel-Mazzetti (1871–1955, Austria/Austria-Hungary), poet & nv.
Elizabeth Hands (1746–1815, England), poet
Khady Hane (b. 1962, Senegal/France), nv.
Helene Hanff (1916–1997, United States), wr. & screenwriter; 84, Charing Cross Road
Hani Motoko (羽仁もと子, 1873–1957, Japan), col. & autobiographer
Kristin Hannah (b. 1960, United States), nv.
Sophie Hannah (b. 1971, England), poet & nv.
Emma Hannigan (1972–2018, Ireland), wr.
Anne Hänninen (b. 1958, Finland), poet & es.
Barbara Hanrahan (1939–1991, Australia), nv. & artist
Lorraine Hansberry (1930–1965, United States), pw.
Bente Hansen (1940–2022, Denmark), wr. & activist
Anita Hansemann (1962–2019, Switzerland), fiction & social wr. in German
Carola Hansson (b. 1942, Sweden), nv. & pw.
Bergtóra Hanusardóttir (b. 1946, Faroe Islands), fiction wr.
Hao Jingfang (郝景芳, b. 1984, China), science fiction nv.
Volha Hapeyeva (b. 1982, Belarus), poet & linguist
Maha Harada (原田マハ, b. 1962, Japan), nv.
Anwara Syed Haq (b. 1940, India/Bangladesh), fiction & ch. wr.
Ingibjörg Haraldsdóttir (1942–2016, Iceland), poet
Nino Haratischwili (b. 1983, Georgia (Caucasus)), nv. & pw.
Elizabeth Boynton Harbert (1843–1925, United States), wr.
Thea von Harbou (1888–1954, Germany), nv. & screenwriter
Kerry Hardie (b. 1951, Singapore/Northern Ireland), poet & nv.
Ratih Hardjono (b. 1960, Indonesia), socio-political wr.
Elizabeth Hardy (1794–1854, Ireland/England), nv.
Stacy Hardy (living, South Africa), fiction wr. & col. in English
Maud Cuney Hare (1874–1936, United States), wr. & pianist
Lesbia Harford (1891–1927, Australia), poet, nv. & activist
Githa Hariharan (b. 1954, India), nv.
Joy Harjo (b. 1951, United States), poet
Anna-Leena Härkönen (b. 1965, Finland), nv., stage & TV wr.
Saima Harmaja (1913–1937, Finland), poet & diarist
Beverley Harper (1943–2002, Australia), nv.
Frances Harper (1825–1911, United States), poet & nv.
Jacqueline Harpman (1929–2012, Belgium), wr. in French
Alice Harriman (1861–1925, United States), poet
Amanda Bartlett Harris (1824–1917, United States), wr. & critic
Dorothy Joan Harris (b. 1931, Japan/Canada/Newfoundland), ch. wr.
Emily Marion Harris (1844–1900, England), nv. & poet
Ethel Hillyer Harris (1859–1931, United States), wr.
Jane Elizabeth Harris (c. 1853–1942, England/New Zealand), wr. & spiritualist
Joanne Harris (b. 1964, England), nv.
M. G. Harris (b. 1966, Mexico/England), ch. wr.
Nancy Harris (living, Ireland/England), pw. & screenwriter
Jennifer Harrison (b. 1955, Australia), poet
Juanita Harrison (1887–1967, United States), autobiographer
Sarah Harrison (b. 1946, England), nv. & ch. wr.
Elizabeth Harrower (1928–2020, Australia), fiction wr.
Carla Harryman (b. 1952, United States), poet, es. & pw.
Anne Le Marquand Hartigan (living, Ireland), poet, pw. & painter
Milka Hartman (1902–1997, Yugoslavia/Slovenia), poet
Petra Hartmann (b. 1970, Germany), nv. & ch. wr.
Nanae Haruno (榛野なな恵, J, manga creator
Elisabeth Harvor (b. 1936, Canada/Newfoundland), nv. & poet
Gwen Harwood (1920–1995, Australia), poet & librettist
Johanna Harwood (b. 1930, Ireland/England), screenwriter
Nigar Hasan-Zadeh (living, Azerbaijan), poet & philologist
Iulia Hasdeu (1869–1888, Romania/France), poet
Machiko Hasegawa (長谷川町子, 1920–1992, Japan), manga creator
Hasegawa Shigure (長谷川時雨, 1879–1941, Japan), pw. & editor
Dilara Hashem (1936–2022, India/Bangladesh), nv.
Sugako Hashida (橋田 壽賀子, 1925–2021, Japan), scriptwriter
Khadijah Hashim (b. 1942, Malaysia), fiction & ch. wr. & poet
Eveline Hasler (b. 1933, Switzerland), fiction & ch. wr.
Shahida Hassan (b. 1953, Bangladesh/Pakistan), poet
Margaret Hasse (b. 1950, United States), poet & wr.
Satu Hassi (b. 1951, Finland), textbook wr. & politician
Pirjo Hassinen (b. 1957, Finland), nv.
Kirsten Hastrup (b. 1948, Denmark), anthropologist
Isoko Hatano (波多野勤子, 1905–1978, Japan), writer & psychologist
Mary R. P. Hatch (1848–1935, United States), poet, fiction wr.
Chandrakala A. Hate (1903–1990, India), social wr.
Ana Hatherly (1929–2015, Portugal), academic & poet
Libby Hathorn (b. 1943, Australia), poet, librettist & ch. wr.
Bisco Hatori (葉鳥ビスコ, b. 1975), manga creator
Miyuki Hatoyama (鳩山幸, b. 1943, Japan), cookery wr. & actor
Ann Hatton (1764–1838, England), nv. & poet
Mihri Hatun (c.1460–1506, Turkey/Ottoman Empire), poet
Mireille Havet (1898–1932, France), poet, diarist & nv.
Anne Haverty (b. 1959, Ireland), nv. & poet
Bettina Hauge (b. 1964, Denmark), anthropologist
Mila Haugová (b. 1942, Czechoslovakia/Czech Republic/Slovakia), poet
Jiřina Hauková (1919–2005, Czechoslovakia/Czech Republic), poet & translator
Marie-Louise Haumont (1919–2012, Belgium), nv. in French
Eva Hauserová (b. 1954, Czechoslovakia/Czech Republic), science fiction & non-f. wr.
Marlen Haushofer (1920–1970, Austria/Austria-Hungary), fiction wr.
Esther Hautzig (1930–2009, Poland/United States), mem. & ch. wr.
Kathleen Hawkins (1883–1981, Sri Lanka/New Zealand), poet
Paula Hawkins (b. 1972, Zimbabwe/England), wr.
Susan Hawthorne (b. 1951), fiction & non-f. wr. & poet
Catherine Hay (1910–1995, New Zealand), nv.
Elizabeth Hay (b. 1951, Canada/Newfoundland), fiction wr.
Karyn Hay (b. 1959, New Zealand), nv. & broadcaster
Myfanwy Haycock (1913–1963, Wales), poet & broadcaster
Anna Haycraft (Alice Thomas Ellis, 1932–2005, Wales), wr. & es.
Mary Hayden (1862–1942, Ireland), historian
Renée Hayek (living, Lebanon), fiction wr.
Matilda Hays (1820–1897, England), wr., journalist & actress
Victoria Hayward (1876–1956, Bermuda), col. & travel wr.
Eliza Haywood (1693–1756, England), nv., pw. & poet
Helen Haywood (1907–1995, England), ch. wr.
Shirley Hazzard (1931–2016, United States), nv. & fiction wr.
Bessie Head (1937–1986, Botswana), fiction & non-f. wr.
Helen Heath (b. 1970, New Zealand), poet
Anne Hébert (1916–2000, Canada/Newfoundland), poet & nv.
Chantal Hébert (b. 1954, Canada/Newfoundland), political col.
Jennifer Michael Hecht (b. 1965, United States), poet, historian & philosopher
Annie French Hector (1825–1902, Ireland/England), nv.
Barbro Hedvall (b. 1944, Sweden), education wr.
Geum Hee (금희, b. 1979, Korea/China), fiction wr. in Korean
Sylvia Vanden Heede (b. 1961, Belgium), ch. wr. in Flemish
Ra Heeduk (나희덕, b. 1966, Korea), poet
Marjorie van Heerden (b. 1949, South Africa), ch. wr. in Afrikaans & illustrator
Marié Heese (b. 1942, South Africa), nv. in Afrikaans
Ursula Hegi (b. 1946, Germany/United States), nv.
Marie Heiberg (1890–1942, England), poet
Uta-Maria Heim (b. 1963, Germany), crime wr., poet & pw.
Úrsula Heinze (b. 1941, Germany/Spain), poet & fiction and ch. wr. in Galician
Anita Heiss (b. 1968, Australia), fiction wr., poet & col.
Lyn Hejinian (b. 1941, United States), poet, es. & translator
Lin Van Hek (b. 1944, Australia), fiction wr.
Etelka Kenéz Heka (b. 1936, Hungary), wr. & poet
Liliana Heker (b. 1943, Argentina), fiction wr. & es.
Guðrún Helgadóttir (1935–2022, Iceland), ch. wr.
Adèle Hommaire de Hell (1819–1883, France), wr.
Cat Hellisen (b. 1977, South Africa/Scotland), nv.
Lillian Hellman (1905–1984, United States), pw.
Lucinda Barbour Helm (1839–1897, United States), wr. & editor
Guðrið Helmsdal (b. 1941, Faroe Islands), poet
Rakel Helmsdal (b. 1966, Faroe Islands), fiction & non-f. wr.
Felicia Hemans (1793–1835, England/Wales), poet in English
Kristien Hemmerechts (b. 1955, Belgium), fiction wr. in Flemish & English
Mercedes Sandoval de Hempel (1919–2005, Paraguay), social wr.
Barbara Hemphill (died 1858, Ireland), nv.
Beth Henley (b. 1952, United States), pw. & screenwriter
Nathalie Henneberg (1910–1977, France), science fiction wr.
Claire Hennessy (b. 1986, Ireland), YA wr.
Emmy Hennings (1885–1948, Germany), poet & performer
Agnes Henningsen (1868–1962, Denmark), fiction wr. & mem.
Georgina Henry (1960–2014, England), journalist
Marguerite Henry (1902–1997, United States), ch. wr.
Luise Hensel (1798–1876, Germany), wr. & poet
Rosa Henson (1927–1997, Philippines), autobiographer
Ebba Hentze (1930–2015, Faroe Islands), ch. wr. & poet
Heo Nanseolheon (허초희, 1563–1589, Korea), poet
Heo Su-gyeong (허수경, 1964–2018, Korea)
Sally Hepworth (b. 1980, Australia), wr.
Toeti Heraty (1933–2021, Indonesia), poet
Dorothea Herbert (c. 1767–1829, Ireland), diarist & poet
Jane Emily Herbert (1821–1882, Ireland), poet
Marie Herbert (b. 1941, Ireland/England), biographer & nv.
Mary Sidney Herbert (1561–1621, England), poet & patron
Sarah Herbert (1824–1846, Ireland/Canada/Newfoundland), wr.
Iva Hercíková (1935–2007, Czechoslovakia/Czech Republic), nv. & screenplay wr.
María Luisa Ocampo Heredia (1899–1974, Mexico), nv. & pw.
Íeda Herman (1925–2019, Iceland), wr.
Judith Hermann (b. 1970, Germany), fiction wr.
Catherine Hermary-Vieille (b. 1943, France), nv.
Marie Hermanson (b. 1956, Sweden), nv.
Luisa Josefina Hernández (1928–2023, Mexico), nv. & pw.
Georgina Herrera (1936–2021, Cuba), poet
M. Miriam Herrera (living, United States), wr. & poet
Jeanne Hersch (1910–2000, Switzerland), philosopher in French
Stella K. Hershan (1915–2014, Austria/Austria-Hungary/United States), nv. & biographer
Judith Herzberg (b. 1934, Netherlands), poet & pw.
Karen Hesse (b. 1952, United States), ch. nv.
Juliette Heuzey (1865–1952, France), nv. & biog.
Dorothy Hewett (1923–2002, Australia), poet, nv. & pw.
Ellen Hewett (1843–1926, Channel Islands/New Zealand), wr.
Annie Hewlett (1887–1974), Canada, wr.
Maryam Heydarzadeh (b. 1977, Iran/Persia), poet & singer.
Elisabeth von Heyking (1861–1925, Germany), nv., travel wr. & diarist

Hi–Hy
Grace Hibbard (ca. 1835 – 1911, United States), wr. & poet
Eleanor Hibbert (several pseudonyms, 1906–1993, England), nv.
Nienke van Hichtum (1860–1939, Netherlands), ch. wr. also in West Frisian
Elizabeth Hickey (1917–1999, Ireland), local historian
Emily Henrietta Hickey (1845–1924, Ireland/England), wr. & poet
Mary St Domitille Hickey (1882–1958, New Zealand), historian & nun
Mary Agnes Hickson (1821–1899, Ireland), antiquarian
Stefani Hid (b. 1985, Indonesia/Germany), fiction wr.
Akiko Higashimura (東村アキコ, b. 1975, Japan), manga creator
F. E. Higgins (living, Ireland), ch. wr.
Rita Ann Higgins (b. 1955, Ireland), poet & pw.
Sarah Higgins (1830–1923, England/New Zealand), wr. & midwife
Colleen Higgs (b. 1962, South Africa), poet & fiction wr. in English
Helen Burns Higgs (1897–1983, Bahamas), wr. & illustrator
Patricia Highsmith (1921–1995, United States), crime fiction wr.
Asa Higuchi (ひぐちアサ, b. 1970, Japan), manga creator
Keiko Higuchi (樋口恵子, b. 1932, Japan), social wr. & activist
Ichiyō Higuchi (樋口一葉, 1872–1896, Japan), fiction wr.
Tachibana Higuchi (樋口橘, b. 1976, Japan), manga creator
Aoi Hiiragi (柊あおい, b. 1962, Japan), manga creator
Nadia Hijab (living, Palestine/United States), political wr.
Hildegard of Bingen (1098–1179, Germany), wr. in Latin, composer & abbess
Ernestine Hill (1900–1972, Australia), travel wr. & nv.
Eva Hill (1898–1981, New Zealand), wr. & physician
Lorna Hill (1902–1991, England), ch. nv.
Rosemary Hill (b. 1957, England), wr. & historian
Rut Hillarp (1914–2003, Sweden), poet & nv.
Wilhelmine von Hillern (1836–1916, Germany), nv. and actor
Etty Hillesum (1914–1943, Netherlands), correspondent, diarist & Hc. victim
Joanne C. Hillhouse (b. 1970s, Antigua), wr., col. & educator
Hilda Hilst (1930–2004, Brazil), poet, pw. & nv.
Kaoruko Himeno (姫野カオルコ, b. 1958, Japan), nv.
Saeko Himuro (氷室冴子, 1957–2008, Japan), nv., es. & pw.
Zahida Hina (living, India/Pakistan), es., fiction wr. & pw.
Helen Hindpere, (Estonia), writer
Vera Hingorani (1924–2018, India), gynecologist & medical wr.
Pamela Hinkson (1900–1982, Ireland/England), nv.
Matsuri Hino (樋野まつ, Japan), manga creator
S. E. Hinton (b. 1948, United States), ch. nv.
Taiko Hirabayashi (平林たい子, 1905–1972, Japan), fiction wr. & es.
Hiratsuka Raichō (平塚らいちょう, 1886–1971, Japan), writer & activist
Rozalie Hirs (b. 1965, Netherlands), poet & composer
Afua Hirsch (b. 1981, England), wr. & broadcaster
Marianne Van Hirtum (1925–1988, Belgium), poet in French
Anna-Liisa Hirviluoto (1929–2000, Finland), archaeologist
Laila Hirvisaari (1938–2021, Finland), fiction wr. & pw.
Elina Hirvonen (b. 1975, Finland), wr. & film-maker
Sofia Hjärne (1780–1860, Finland), salonnière & nv. in Swedish
Hera Hjartardóttir (b. 1983, Iceland),
Dagmar Hjort (1860–1902, Denmark), educator & activist
Mary Hobhouse (1864–1901, Ireland/England), poet & nv.
Laura Z. Hobson (1900–1986, United States), nv.
Karla Höcker (1901–1992, Germany), nv. & biographer
Merle Hodge (b. 1944, Trinidad), nv. & critic
Louise Manning Hodgkins (1846–1935, United States), wr. & educator
Helen Hodgman (1945–2022, Australia), nv. & screenwriter
Eva Hodgson (1924–1920, Bermuda), political wr.
Daniela Hodrová (b. 1946, Czechoslovakia/Czech Republic), wr. & scholar
Marjolijn Hof (b. 1956, Netherlands), ch. wr.
Alice Hoffman (b. 1952, United States), nv. & YA & ch. wr.
Nina Kiriki Hoffman (b. 1955, United States), fiction wr.
Klementyna Hoffmanowa (1798–1845, Poland), fiction & ch. wr. & activist
Barbara Hofland (1770–1844, England), ch. wr. & poet
Linda Hogan (b. 1947, United States), poet & fiction wr.
Zita Holbourne (b. 1960s, England), poet and non-fic. wr.
Margaret Holford (1778–1852, England), poet & nv.
Margaret Holford the Elder (1757–1834, England), nv, pw. & poet
Heidi Holland (1947–2012, South Africa), col. & wr. in English
Jane Holland (b. 1966, Isle of Man), poet, performer & nv.
Norah M. Holland (1876–1925, Canada), wr., poet
Sarah Holland (b. 1961, Isle of Man), wr., actor & singer
Xaviera Hollander (b. 1943, Netherlands), mem.
Gwen Hollington (1919–2014, England), translator
Liddy Holloway (1947–2004, New Zealand), TV scriptwriter & actor
Anne Holm (1922–1998, Denmark), col. & ch. wr.
Maria Holm (1845–1912, Latvia), poet & fiction wr. in German
Ada Augusta Holman (1869–1949, Australia), fiction & non-f. wr.
Charlie N. Holmberg (b. 1988, United States), fantasy wr.
Constance Holme (1880–1955, England), nv. & pw.
Janet Holmes (b. 1947, New Zealand), socio-linguistics wr.
Margie Holmes (living, Philippines), psychologist
Mary Anne Holmes (1773–1805, Ireland), poet & wr.
Johanna Holmström (b. 1981, Finland), fiction wr. in Swedish
Lyubov Holota (b. 1949, Ukraine), fiction & non-f. wr. & poet
Hanne-Vibeke Holst (b. 1959, Denmark), fiction & non-f. wr.
Henriette Roland Holst (1869–1952, Netherlands), poet & politician
Winifred Holtby (1898–1935, England), nv. & col.
Xiao Hong (蕭紅, 1911–1942, China), fiction wr.
Hong Yun-suk (홍윤숙, 1925–2015, Korea), poet
Barbara Honigmann (b. 1949, Germany/France), pw.
Hong Ying (虹影, b. 1962, China), poet & fiction wr.
Lynley Hood (b. 1942, New Zealand), biographer
Hilda Mary Hooke (1898–1978, Canada), poet & pw
bell hooks (pen name of Gloria Jean Watkins; 1952–2021, United States), feminist academic
Maryam Hooleh (b. 1978, Iran/Persia), wr. & poet
Ellen Sturgis Hooper (1812–1848, United States), poet
Ofelia Hooper (1900–1981, Panama), poet & activist
Pauline Hopkins (1859–1930, United States), nv., col. & pw.
Nalo Hopkinson (b. 1960, Jamaica/Canada/Newfoundland), fiction wr.
Mererid Hopwood (b. 1964, Wales), poet
María Gertrudis Hore (1742–1801, Spain), poet
Jessica Horn (b. 1979, England), activist & poet
Marya Hornbacher (b. 1974, United States), wr. & col.
Maria Teresa Horta (b. 1937, Portugal), poet & activist
Corinne Stocker Horton (1871–1947, United States), non-f. wr., ed.
Ellen Hørup (1871–1953, Denmark), non-f. wr.
Sally El Hosaini (living, Wales), scriptwriter & film director
Tatsuko Hoshino (星野立子, 1903–1984, Japan), poet
Chieko Hosokawa (細川智栄子, b. 1935, Japan), manga creator
Janette Turner Hospital (b. 1942, Australia), fiction wr.
Selina Hossain (b. 1947, India/Bangladesh), nv.
Yumi Hotta (堀田由美, b. 1957, Japan), manga creator
Colette Sénami Agossou Houeto (b. 1939, Benin), poet & educator
Norah Hoult (1898–1984, Ireland/England), fiction wr.
Gisèle Hountondji (b. 1954, Benin), nv. & es.
Jeanne Wakatsuki Houston (b. 1934, United States), wr.
Annelise Hovmand (1926–2016, Denmark), screenwriter & film director
Maureen Howard (1930–2022, United States), nv., mem. & editor
Philippa Howden-Chapman (living, New Zealand), public health wr. & academic
Fanny Howe (b. 1940, United States), poet & fiction wr.
Julia Ward Howe (1819–1910, United States), abolitionist, activist & poet; "The Battle Hymn of the Republic"
Susan Howe (b. 1937, United States), poet, scholar & critic
Ada Verdun Howell (1902–1981, Australia/United States), poet
Edith Howes (1872–1954, England/New Zealand), ch. wr. & educator
Anna Mary Howitt (1824–1884, England), wr. & feminist
Mary Howitt (1799–1888, England), poet & ch. wr.; "The Spider and the Fly"
Ana María Vázquez Hoys (b. 1945, Spain), Anc. history professor
Elizabeth Hoyt (pen name Julia Harper, living, United States), nv.
Elizabeth Orpha Sampson Hoyt (pen name Aunt Libbie; 1828–1912, United States), philosopher, poet, wr., lecturer
Hrotsvith von Gandersheim (c. 935–c. 1002, Germany), pw. & poet in Latin
Hrytsko Hryhorenko (1867–1924, Ukraine), poet & col.
Maryna Hrymych (b. 1961, Ukraine), nv. & academic
Hu Lanqi (胡兰畦, 1901–1994, China), wr. & military commander
Ganggang Hu Guidice (胡剛剛, b. 1984, United States), writer & artist
Huang E (黄峨, 1498–1569, China), poet
Madame Huarui (花蕊夫人, c. 940–976, China), poet & imperial concubine
Therese Huber (1764–1829, Germany), fiction & travel wr.
Ricarda Huch (1864–1947, Germany), historian, nv. & poet
Anna Hude (1858–1934, Denmark), historian
Eva Hudečková (b. 1949, Czechoslovakia/Czech Republic), wr. & pw.
Kerry Hudson (b. 1980, Scotland), wr. & nv.
Mary-Anne Plaatjies van Huffel (1959–2020, South Africa), pastor & academic
Arianna Huffington (b. 1950, Gk/United States), wr. & col.
Pauline von Hügel (1858–1901, England), religious wr.
Lynn Huggins-Cooper (b. 1964, England), fiction, non-f. & ch. wr.
Ann Harriet Hughes (Gwyneth Vaughan, 1852–1910, Wales), nv.
Babette Hughes (1906–1982, United States), pw.
Caoilinn Hughes (living, Ireland), fiction wr.
Ellen Hughes (1867–1927, Wales), poet, es. & suffragist
Frieda Hughes (b. 1960, England), poet & painter
Shirley Fenton Huie (1924–2016, Australia), non-f. wr.
Hulda (1881–1946, Iceland), wr. & poet
Akasha Gloria Hull (b. 1944, United States), poet, educator & critic
Keri Hulme (1947–2021, New Zealand), fiction wr. & poet
Petra Hůlová (b. 1979, Czechoslovakia/Czech Republic), nv.
Maria Aletta Hulshoff (1781–1846, Netherlands), pamphleteer
Marie-Thérèse Humbert (b. 1940, Mauritius), fiction wr.
Margaret Wolfe Hungerford (1855–1897, Ireland), nv.
Arlene Hunt (b. 1972, Ireland), crime wr.
Vilma Rose Hunt (1926–2012, Australia/United States), scientist
Bem Le Hunte (b. 1964, India/Australia), nv.
Anne Hunter (1742–1821, England), poet & salonnière
Kristin Hunter (1931–2008, United States), nv.
Constance Hunting (1925–2006, United States), poet
Florence Huntley (1861–1912, United States), editor & humorist
Dương Thu Hương (b. 1947, Vietnam), dissident & nv.
Hồ Xuân Hương (1772–1822, Vietnam), poet
Fannie Hurst (1885–1968, United States), nv.
Rosalind Hursthouse (b. 1943, England/New Zealand), moral philosopher
Zora Neale Hurston (1891–1960, United States), fiction wr., folklorist & anthropologist
Shahrukh Husain (b. 1950, Pakistan/England), wr. of fiction, non-f. & screenwriter
Sibyl Marvin Huse (1866–1939, France/United States), non-f.
Fahmida Hussain (b. 1948, Pakistan), literary scholar
Saliha Abid Hussain (1913–1988, India), nv. & ch. wr.
Nancy Huston (b. 1953, Canada/Newfoundland), nv. & es. in French & English
Genevieve L. Hutchinson (1883–1974, United States), poet
Lucy Hutchinson (1620–1681, England), biographer
Krishna Hutheesing (1907–1967, India), biographer
Emily Huws (b. 1942, Wales), ch. wr.
Elspeth Huxley (1907–1997, England/Kenya), mem. & col.
Cornélie Huygens (1948–2002, Netherlands), nv. & political wr.
Hwang In-suk (황인숙, b. 1958, Korea), poet
Hwang Jini (황진이, c. 1506 – c. 1560, Korea), courtesan
Hwang Jung-eun (황정은, b. 1976, Korea), fiction wr.
Hwang Sun-mi (황선미, b. 1963, Korea), fable wr. & academic
Robin Hyde (1906–1939, South Africa/New Zealand), poet
Liz Hyder (b. 1976 or 1977, England), nv.
Lady Hyegyeong (헌경왕후, 1735–1816, Korea), mem.
Prue Hyman (b. 1943, New Zealand), economist
Hypatia (c. 350/370–415, Ancient Greece), philosopher & mathematician in Latin

I

Marcela Iacub (b. 1964, Argentina), nv. & es. in French
Juana de Ibarbourou (1892–1979, Uruguay), poet
Eva Ibbotson (1925–2010, Austria/Austria-Hungary/England), nv. in English
Nilima Ibrahim (1921–2002, Bangladesh), wr.
Amelia Denis de Icaza (1836–1911, Panama), poet
Carmen de Icaza, 8th Baroness of Claret (1899–1979, Spain), nv.
Ida, Countess von Hahn-Hahn (1805–1880, Germany), nv.
Yumiko Igarashi (いがらしゆみこ, b. 1950, Japan), manga creator
Luisa Igloria (b. 1961, Philippines/United States), poet
Jung Ihyun (b. 1972, Korea), wr.
Lempi Ikävalko (1901–1994, Finland), poet & col.
Koi Ikeno (池野恋, b. 1959, Japan), manga creator
Gō Ikeyamada (池山田剛, living, Japan), manga creator
Bassey Ikpi (b. 1976, Nigeria), poet & mental health advocate
Shaista Suhrawardy Ikramullah (1915–2000, India/Pakistan), fiction & non-f. wr.
Ryo Ikuemi (いくえみ綾, b. 1964, Japan), manga/creator
Branislava Ilić (b. 1970, El Salvador), pw., prose & screenwriter
Maria Ilnicka (1825/1827–1897, Poland), poet, nv. & translator
Im Yunjidang (任允摯堂, 1721–1793, Korea), scholar & philosopher
Jahanara Imam (1929–1994, Bangladesh), non-f. wr., diarist & activist
Natsuko Imamura (今村夏子, b. 1980), fiction wr.
Saba Imtiaz (b. 1985, Pakistan), nv. & col.
Vera Inber (1890–1972, Russia/Soviet Union), poet & es.
Elizabeth Inchbald (1753–1821, England), nv., actor & pw.
Mirjam Indermaur (b. 1967, Switzerland), psychotherapy wr. in German
M. K. Indira (1917–1994, India), nv.
Marilla Baker Ingalls (1828–1902, United States/Burma), non-f. wr.
Rachel Ingalls (1940–2019, United States), nv.
Jean Ingelow (1820–1897, England), poet
Elisabeth Inglis-Jones (1900–1994, Wales), nv. & biographer
Anne Bower Ingram (1937–2010, Australia), ch. wr.
Lotte Ingrisch (1930–2022, Austria/Austria-Hungary), nv., pw. & screenwriter
Catherine Lucy Innes (c. 1840–1900, England/New Zealand), wr.
Bozenna Intrator (b. 1964, Poland/United States), nv., poet & pw. in German, Polish & English
Sylvia Iparraguirre (b. 1947, Argentina), nv. & activist
Ōtomo no Sakanoe no Iratsume (大伴坂上郎女, c. 700–750, Japan), poet
Mary E. Ireland (1834–1927, United States), wr., translator, poet
Fanny Irvine-Smith (1878–1948, New Zealand), col. & local historian
Inez Haynes Irwin (1873–1970, Brazil/United States), fiction & non-f. wr.
Norah Isaac (1914–2003, Wales), wr. & educator
Ulla Isaksson (1916–2000, Sweden), fiction wr. & screenwriter
Palmira Jaquetti i Isant (1895–1963, Spain), poet & ethnologist
Ada Maria Isasi-Diaz (1943–2012, Cuba/United States), theologian & non-f. wr.
Svetlana Ischenko (b. 1969, Ukraine), poet, translator & actor
Lady Ise (伊勢, c. 875–c. 938, Japan), poet
Ise no Taifu (伊勢大輔, fl. early 11th century, Japan), poet
Yuka Ishii (石井遊佳, b. 1953, Japan/India), fiction wr.
Aleksandra Ishimova (1805–1881, Russia), ch. wr. & translator
Michiko Ishimure (石牟礼道子, 1927–2018, Japan), wr. & activist
Farhat Ishtiaq (b. 1980, Pakistan), nv. & screenwriter
Elizabeth Isichei (b. 1939, Nigeria), wr. & academic
Kate Isitt (1876–1948, New Zealand/England), col. & nv.
Nina Iskrenko (1951–1995, Russia), poet
Sariamin Ismail (1909–1995, Dutch East Indies/Indonesia), nv.
Siti Zainon Ismail (b. 1949, Malaysia), fiction wr., poet & academic
Rashidah Ismaili (b. 1941, Benin/United States), poet, fiction wr. & pw.
Dora d'Istria (1828–1888, Romania/Italy), wr. on science & politics
Gerta Ital (1904–1988, Germany), non-f. wr.
Frances Itani (b. 1942, Canada/Newfoundland), nv., poet & es.
Keiko Itō (伊藤 敬子, 1935–2020, Japan), poet
Itō Noe (伊藤野枝, 1895–1983, Japan), wr. & social critic
Risa Itō (伊藤理佐, b. 1969, Japan), manga creator
Natsumi Itsuki (樹なつみ, b. 1960, Japan), manga creator
Edna Iturralde (b. 1948, Ecuador), ch. wr.
Nora Iuga (b. 1931, Romania), poet and prose wr.
Jurga Ivanauskaitė (1961–2007, Lithuania), nv. & es.
Oksana Ivanenko (1906–1997), children's wr. & translator
Mirela Ivanova (b. 1962, Bulgaria), poet
Praskovya Ivanovskaya (1852–1935, Russia/Soviet Union), autobiographer
Rada Iveković (b. 1945, Yugoslavia/Croatia), philosopher
Nada Iveljić (1931–2009, Yugoslavia/Croatia), ch. wr.
Eowyn Ivey (living, United States), nv.
Molly Ivins (1944–2007, United States), col.
Helen Ivory (b. 1969, England), poet
Princess Iwa (磐之媛命, died 347, Japan), poet
Mariko Iwadate (岩館真理子, b. 1957, Japan), manga creator
Margarita de Mayo Izarra (1889–1969, Spain), literature wr.
Mari Carmen Izquierdo (1950–2019, Spain), sports wr.
Kaneyoshi Izumi (和泉かねよし, living, Japan), manga creator
Izumi Shikibu (和泉式部, b. c. 976, Japan), poet

J

Ja–Jh
Noni Jabavu (1931–2008, South Africa), mem. & col. in English
Jožka Jabůrková (1896–1942, Austria/Austria-Hungary/Czechoslovakia/Czech Republic), wr. & translator
Annemarie Jacir (living, Palestine), fiction & screenwriter
Helen Hunt Jackson (1830–1885, United States), nv.; Ramona
Shelley Jackson (b. 1963, Philippines/United States), fiction wr. & es.
Shirley Jackson (1916–1965, United States), fiction wr.
Sandra Jackson-Opoku (b. 1953, United States), poet, nv. & screenwriter
Rosamond Jacob (1888–1960, Ireland), wr. & diarist
Violet Jacob (1863–1946, Scotland), poet & nv.
Harriet Jacobs (1813–1897, United States), mem.; Incidents in the Life of a Slave Girl
Annie Jacobsen (b. 1967, United States), non-f. wr.
Josephine Jacobsen (1908–2003, United States), poet, fiction wr. & critic
Lis Jacobsen (1882–1961, Denmark), philologist & archaeologist
Ethel Jacobson (1899–1991, United States), poet
Agnes E. Jacomb (1866–1949, England), nv.
Paula Jacques (b. 1949, Egypt/France), nv.
Frances Jacson (1754–1842, England), nv.
Doris Jadan (1925–2004, United States), natural historian & cookery wr.
Ann Jäderlund (b. 1955, Sweden), poet & pw.
Fleur Jaeggy (b. 1940, Switzerland), nv. in Italian
Kim Jae-Young (b. 1966, Korea), wr. & academic
Manorama Jafa (b. 1932, India), ch. wr.
Ada Jafarey (1924–2015, Pakistan), poet in Urdu
Aziza Jafarzade (1921–2003, Azerbaijan), wr. & philologist
Noemi Jaffe (b. 1962, Brazil), wr. & critic
Rona Jaffe (1932–2005, United States), nv.
Janet Jagan (1920–2009, United States/Guyana), poet, ch. wr. & politician
Dorta Jagić (b. 1974, Yugoslavia/Canada/Newfoundland), poet & wr.
Annamarie Jagose (b. 1965, New Zealand), fiction wr. & academic
Nasreen Jahan (b. 1966, Bangladesh), nv. & editor
Rashid Jahan (1905–1952, India), fiction wr. & pw.
Meenakshi Jain (living, India), historian
Sunita Jain (1940–2017, India), scholar, fiction wr. & poet
Linda Jaivin (b. 1955, Australia), nv. & non-f. wr.
Svava Jakobsdóttir (1930–2004, Iceland), pw. & fiction wr.
Elfriede Jaksch (1842–1897, Latvia), fiction wr. in German
Ayesha Jalal (b. 1956, Pakistan/United States), historian
Magdalena Jalandoni (1891–1978, Philippines), feminist wr.
Rosa Jamali (b. 1977, Iran/Persia), poet, critic & pw.
Alice James (1848–1892, United States), diarist
Andrea James (b. 1967, United States), non-f wr. & transgender activist
Barbara James (1943–2003, Australia), historian
Christine James (b. 1954, Wales), poet & academic
Cynthia James (b. 1948, Trinidad/Canada/Newfoundland), pw., fiction wr. & poet
Florence James (1902–1993, New Zealand/Australia), wr.
Maria James (1793–1868, Wales), poet
P. D. James (1920–2014, England), nv.
Rebecca James (b. 1970, Australia), YA wr.
Wendy James (b. 1966, Australia), nv.
Wendy James (b. 1940, England), anthropologist
Winifred Lewellin James (1876–1941, Australia), nv. & travel wr.
Anna Brownell Jameson (1794–1860, Ireland/England), art & literature wr.
Vilma Jamnická (1906–2008, Czechoslovakia/Czech Republic/Slovakia), astrologer & actor
Emma Jane (b. 1969, Australia), nv. & col.
Maria de la Pau Janer (b. 1966, Spain), nv. in Catalan & Spanish
Clara Janés (b. 1940, Spain), poet, fiction wr. & es.
Elizabeth Janeway (1913–2005, United States), nv.
Jang Eun-jin (장은진, b. 1976, Korea)
Éva Janikovszky (1926–2003, Hungary), ch. wr.
Maria Janitschek (Marius Stein, 1859–1927, Austria/Austria-Hungary), poet & fiction wr.
Tama Janowitz (b. 1957, United States), fiction wr. & screenwriter
Tove Jansson (1914–2001, Finland), nv. & ch. wr. in Swedish
Anja Jantschik (b. 1969, Germany), wr. & col.
Florence Page Jaques (1890–1972, United States), nature & travel wr.
Rosemary Hawley Jarman (1935–2015, England), fiction wr.
Dragojla Jarnević (1812–1875, Austria/Austria-Hungary), poet in Croatian
Lisa Jarnot (b. 1967, United States), poet
Nada Awar Jarrar (living, Lebanon), nv.
Bella Jarrett (1926–2007, United States), romance wr. & actor
Delia Jarrett-Macauley (living, England), wr., academic & broadcaster
Marguerite Florence Laura Jarvis (Oliver Sandys, 1886–1964, Wales), nv. & actor
Christine Maria Jasch (b. 1960, Austria/Austria-Hungary), economist & non-f. wr.
Vidmantė Jasukaitytė (1948–2018, Lithuania), poet, fiction wr. & es.
Florence Jaugey (b. 1959, France/Nicaragua), screenwriter
Fattaneh Haj Seyed Javadi (b. 1945, Iran/Persia), nv.
Aghabeyim agha Javanshir (Aghabaji, 1780–1832, Azerbaijan/Iran/Persia), poet
Charlotte Jay (Geraldine Halls, 1919–1996, Australia), mystery wr.
Pupul Jayakar (1915–1997, India), wr. & activist
Kirthi Jayakumar (b. 1987, India), activist & wr.
Salma Khadra Jayyusi (b. 1926/1927, Palestine/United States), fiction wr. & poet
Rula Jebreal (b. 1973, Israel/Italy), fiction wr. & Palestine analyst
Barbara Jefferis (1917–2004, Australia), radio pw. & nv.
Margo Jefferson (b. 1947, United States), wr. & academic
Sheila Jeffreys (b. 1948, Australia), feminist scholar & wr.
Jefimija (1349–1405, Serbia), poet
Andrea Jeftanovic (b. 1970, Chile), wr. & academic
Gertrude Jekyll (1843–1932, England), garden wr.
Cynthia Jele (living, South Africa), nv. in English
Elfriede Jelinek (b. 1946, Austria/Austria-Hungary), pw. & nv.; 2004 Nobel Prize in Literature
Joyce Angela Jellison (b. 1969, United States), wr.
N. K. Jemisin (b. 1972, United States), science fiction & fantasy wr.
Gish Jen (b. 1956, United States), wr.
Ida Jenbach (1868 – c. 1943, Austria/Austria-Hungary), pw., screenwriter & Hc. victim
Barbara Jenkins (living, Trinidad), fiction wr.
Biddy Jenkinson (b. 1949, Ireland), poet
Elizabeth B. Jenkins American spirituality writer
Rosemary Jenkinson (b. 1967, Northern Ireland), poet, pw. & fiction writer
Lynn Jenner (living, New Zealand), poet & es.
Theodora Robinson Jenness (1847–1935, United States), wr., editor
Elizabeth Jennings (1926–2001, England), poet
Kate Jennings (1948–2021, Australia), poet, nv. & es.
Zoë Jenny (b. 1974, Switzerland), nv. in German & English
Kristine Marie Jensen (Frøken Jensen, 1858–1923, Denmark), domestic & cookery wr.
Thit Jensen (1876–1957, Denmark), fiction wr. & pw.
Helen Jerome (1883–1958, Australia), poet, pw. & non-f. wr.
Milena Jesenská (1896–1944, Austria/Austria-Hungary/Czechoslovakia/Czech Republic), wr. & translator
Ana de Jesús (1545–1621, Spain), wr., poet & nun
Carolina Maria de Jesus (1914–1977, Brazil), diarist & activist
Jaqueline Jesus (b. 1978, Brazil), wr. & activist
Lisa Jewell (b. 1968, England), fiction wr.
Sarah Orne Jewett (1849–1909, United States), fiction wr.
Geraldine Jewsbury (1812–1880, England), nv.
Ruth Prawer Jhabvala (1927–2013), Germany/United States), nv. & screenwriter

Ji–Ju
Jiang Biwei (蔣碧薇, 1899–1978, China), mem.
Pamela Jiles (b. 1960, Chile), col. & politician
Paulette Jiles (b. 1943, United States/Canada/Newfoundland), poet & nv.
Rina Jimenez-David (b. 1955, Philippines), col. & non-f. wr.
Meiling Jin (b. 1956, Guyana/England), poet, fiction and social wr.
Empress Jitō (持統天皇, 645–702, Japan), poet & empress
Jo Kyung-ran (조경란, b. 1969, Korea), nv.
Liesl Jobson (living, South Africa), poet in English & musician
Ann Henning Jocelyn (b. 1948, Sweden/Ireland), pw. & nv.
Rita Joe (1932–2007, Canada/Newfoundland), poet
Alexandra Joel (b. 1953, Australia), fiction & non-f. wr.
Eeva Joenpelto (1921–2004, Finland), nv.
Sigrið av Skarði Joensen (1908–1975, Faroe Islands), col. & teacher
Nadezhda Joffe (1906–1995, Soviet Union/United States), mem.
Khasnor Johan (living, Malaysia), historian
Hanna Johansen (b. 1939, Germany/Switzerland), philology & ch. wr. in German
Oddvør Johansen (b. 1941, Faroe Islands), nv.
Klara Johanson (1875–1948, Sweden), critic & es.
Majken Johansson (1930–1993, Sweden), poet & Salvation Army member
Amryl Johnson (1944–2001, Trinidad/England), poet & travel wr.
Angela Johnson (b. 1961, United States), ch. wr. & poet
Catherine Johnson (b. 1962, England), wr. & screenwriter
Catherine Johnson (b. 1957, England), pw.
Daisy Johnson (b. 1990, England), fiction wr.
Diane Johnson (b. 1934, United States), nv. & es.
Electa Amanda Wright Johnson (1938–1929, United States), es. & non-f. wr.
Georgia Douglas Johnson (1877–1966, United States), poet
Helene Johnson (1906–1995, United States), poet
Josephine Johnson (1910–1990, United States), nv., poet & es.
Kate Johnson (b. 1982, England), nv.
Pauline Johnson (1861–1913, Canada/Newfoundland), poet
Rebecca Johnson (b. 1966, Australia), ch. wr.
Sarah Johnson (b. 1980, South Africa), poet in English
Sophia Orne Johnson (1826–1899, United States), wr
Stephanie Johnson (b. 1961, New Zealand), poet, pw. & fiction wr.
Susan Johnson (b. 1939, United States), nv.
Susan Johnson (b. 1956, Australia), fiction wr.
Susannah Willard Johnson (1729–1810, United States), mem.
Alexa Johnston (living, New Zealand), biographer & food wr.
Christine Johnston (b. 1950, New Zealand), fiction wr.
Dorothy Johnston (b. 1948, Australia), fiction wr.
Jennifer Johnston (b. 1930, Ireland), nv.
Maria I. Johnston (1835-1921, United States), American nv., non-f. wr.
Mary Johnston (1870–1936, United States), nv.
Velda Johnston (1912–1997, United States), nv.
Elísabet Jökulsdóttir (b. 1958, Iceland), poet, fiction wr. & pw.
Elizabeth Jolley (1923–2007, Australia), nv.
Jon Kyongnin (전경린, b. 1962, Korea), poet
Alice Gray Jones (1852–1943, Wales), wr. & editor
Diana Wynne Jones (1934–2011, England), nv.
Gail Jones (b. 1955, Australia), nv. & academic
Gayl Jones (b. 1949, United States), nv.
Jill Jones (b. 1951, Australia), poet
Laura Jones (b. 1951, Australia), screenwriter
Lauren-Shannon Jones (b. c. 1989, Ireland), pw. & screenwriter
Margaret Jones (1923–2006, Australia), fiction & non-f. wr.
Marion Patrick Jones (1931–2016, Trinidad), nv.
Mary Vaughan Jones (1918–1983, Wales), ch. wr. & educator
Patricia Spears Jones (b. 1951, United States), poet
Sandy Jones (b. 1943, United States), parenting wr.
Tayari Jones (b. 1970, United States), nv.
V. M. Jones (b. 1958, Zambia/New Zealand), ch. wr.
Erica Jong (b. 1942, United States), nv.
Ingrid Jonker (1933–1965, South Africa), poet in Afrikaans
Ágústína Jónsdóttir (b. 1949, Iceland), poet & educator
Áslaug Jónsdóttir (b. 1963, Iceland), ch. wr. & pw.
Auður Jónsdóttir (b. 1973, Iceland), nv.
Birgitta Jónsdóttir (b. 1967, Iceland), poet & politician
Pamela Jooste (living, South Africa), nv. in English
June Jordan (1936–2002, United States), poet, nv. & autobiographer
Kate Jordan (1862–1926, Ireland/United States), nv. & pw.
Sherryl Jordan (b. 1949, New Zealand), ch. & YA wr.
Toni Jordan (b. 1966, Australia), nv.
Irena Jordanova (b. 1980, North Macedonia), fiction wr.
Lídia Jorge (b. 1946, Portugal), novelist
Lieve Joris (b. 1953, Belgium), travel wr. in Flemish
Barbare Jorjadze (1833–1895, Georgia (Caucasus)), wr. & princess
Isabel de Josa (c. 1508–1575, Spain), humanist & Latinist
Jenny Joseph (1932–2018, England), poet
Sarah Joseph (b. 1946, India), fiction wr.
Isha Basant Joshi (b. 1908 – post-2004, India), fiction wr. & poet
Rebecca Richardson Joslin (1846–1934, United States), non-f. wr.
Gaëlle Josse (b. 1960, France), poet & nv.
Maria Jotuni (1880–1943, Finland), fiction wr. & pw.
Elsa Joubert (1922–2020, South Africa), nv. in Afrikaans
Irma Joubert (b. 1947, South Africa), nv. in Afrikaans
Leonie Joubert (living, South Africa), science wr. in English
Alice Jouenne (1873-1954, France), non-f. wr.
Carol Joynt (fl. 2010s, United States), writer, businesswoman
Mireille Juchau (b. 1969, Australia), nv.
Juana Teresa Juega López (1885–1979, Spain), poet
Erna Juel-Hansen (1845–1922, Denmark), nv. & activist
Vanda Juknaitė (b. 1949, Lithuania), fiction wr. & pw.
Heidi Julavits (b. 1968, United States), col. & nv.
Conxita Julià (1920–2019, Spain), poet in Catalan
Lucie Julia (b. 1927, Guadeloupe), poet & nv.
Miranda July (b. 1974, United States), wr.
Anees Jung (b. 1944, India), biographer
Jung Eun-gwol (정은궐, living, Korea), nv.
Jung Ihyun (정이현, b. 1972, Korea), nv.
Jung Mikyung (정미경, 1960–2017, Korea), nv.
Mari Jungstedt (b. 1962, Sweden), nv.
Cristina Jurado (b. 1972, Spain), fiction wr.
Irena Jurgielewiczowa (1903–2003, Poland), ch. & YA wr.
Dorothy Misener Jurney (1909–2002, United States), political wr.
Andrea Jutson (living, New Zealand), crime & YA wr.

K

Ka–Kh
Aminata Maïga Ka (1940–2005, Senegal), fiction wr.
Keri Kaa (1942–2020, New Zealand), TV & ch. wr.
Lene Kaaberbøl (b. 1960, Denmark), ch. & crime wr.
Philippa Namutebi Kabali-Kagwa (b. 1964, Uganda/Kenya), mem. & ch. wr.
Naila Kabeer (b. 1950, Bangladesh/England), wr. & economist
Jane Kaberuka (b. 1956, Uganda), fiction wr. & autobiographer
Siddika Kabir (1931–2012, India/Bangladesh), nutrition & cookery wr.
Helena Kadare (b. 1943, Albania), fiction wr.
Margit Kaffka (1880–1918, Hungary), nv. & poet
Sirpa Kähkönen (b. 1964, Finland), nv.
Elina Kahla (b. 1960, Finland), philologist & academic
Elaine Kahn (living, United States), poet & wr.
Ivande Kaija (1876–1942, Latvia), political wr.
Isabelle Kaiser (1866–1925, Switzerland), poet & fiction wr. in French & German
Hilda Käkikoski (1864–1912, Finland), ch. wr. & politician
Nyana Kakoma (living, Uganda), wr.
Maguy Kakon (b. 1953, Morocco), politician & wr
Mitsuyo Kakuta (角田光代, b. 1967, Japan), fiction wr.
Lejla Kalamujić (b. 1980, Yugoslavia/Bosnia-Herzegovina), fiction wr.
Ana Kalandadze (1924–2008, Georgia (Caucasus)), poet
Sheema Kalbasi (b. 1972, Iran/Persia), poet & rights advocate
Zaruhi Kalemkaryan (1871–1971, Armenia), prose wr.
Elvy Kalep (1899–1989, Estonia), ch. wr. & aviator
Aino Kallas (1878–1956, Finland/Estonia), fiction wr. in Finnish
Leszli Kálli (living, Comoros/Canada/Newfoundland), kidnapped diarist
Laxmi Kallicharan (1951–2002, Guyana), wr.
Tuula Kallioniemi (b. 1951, Finland), ch. wr.
Iryna Kalynets (1940–2012, Ukraine), political wr.
Sophie Heidi Kam (b. 1968, Burkina Faso), poet & pw. in French
Sufia Kamal (1911–1999, India/Bangladesh), poet & activist
Ronelda Kamfer (b. 1981, South Africa), poet in Afrikaans
Anna Kamieńska (1920–1986, Poland), poet & ch. & YA wr.
Androulla Kaminara (b. 1957), Cypriot EU official & ambassador
Yoko Kamio (神尾葉子, b. 1966, Japan), manga creator
Sissal Kampmann (b. 1974, Faroe Islands), poet
Vera Kamsha (b. 1962, Soviet Union/Russia), nv.
Keturah Kamugasa (died 2017, Uganda), wr. & col.
Meena Kandasamy (b. 1984, India), poet & fiction wr.
Mare Kandre (1962–2005, Sweden), fiction wr. & poet
Julie Kane (b. 1952, United States), poet, scholar & editor
Sarah Kane (1971–1999, England), pw.
Hitomi Kanehara (金原ひとみ, b. 1983, Japan), nv.
Yadé Kara (b. 1965, Turkey/Ottoman Empire/Germany), nv.
Josiane Kartheiser (b. 1950, Luxembourg), poet, pw. & ch. wr. in German & Luxembourgeois
Beth Kelly, (b. ?, United States) university professor 
Mirdza Ķempe (1907–1974, Latvia), poet & translator
Kang Hwa-gil (b. 1986, South Korea), fiction wr.
Agnès Kraidy (born 1965), Ivorian journalist
Kang Kyeong-ae (강경애, 1906–1944, Korea), nv. & poet
Kang Sok-kyong (강석경, b. 1951, Korea), fiction wr.
Kang Young-sook (강영숙, b. 1967, Korea), fiction wr.
Maarja Kangro (b. 1973, Estonia), poet & fiction wr.
Aya Kanno (菅野文, b. 1980, Japan), manga creator
Fabienne Kanor (b. 1970, France), nv. & filmmaker
Anna Kańtoch (b. 1976, Poland), fiction wr.
Eva Kantůrková (b. 1930, Czechoslovakia/Czech Republic), fiction wr. & screenwriter
Nasiha Kapidžić-Hadžić (1932–1995, Yugoslavia/Bosnia-Herzegovina), ch. wr. & poet
Lila Rose Kaplan (b. 1980, United States), pw.
Nelly Kaplan (1931–2020, Argentina), nv., es. & scriptwriter in French
Kristina Kappelin (b. 1958, Sweden), wr. on Italian relations
Mehrangiz Kar (b. 1944, Iran/Persia), wr. & rights activist
Yadé Kara (b. 1965, Turkey/Ottoman Empire/Germany), nv., actor & educator
Ekaterina Karabasheva (b. 1989, Bulgaria), poet & fiction wr.
Teréz Karacs (1808–1892, Hungary), poet & mem.
Mina Karadžić (1828–1894, Serbia), wr. & painter
Margarita Karapanou (1946–2008, Greece), nv.
Anna Karima (1871–1949, Bulgaria), wr. & activist
Alma Karlin (1889–1950, Yugoslavia/Slovenia), fiction & travel wr. & pw.
Ghada Karmi (b. 1939, Palestine/England), mem. & physician
Farida Karodia (b. 1942, South Africa), fiction wr. in English
Carmen Karr (1865–1943, Spain), feminist wr.
Anna Louisa Karsch (1722–1791, Germany), poet & correspondent
Junko Karube (軽部潤子, living, Japan), manga creator
Ugnė Karvelis (1935–2002, Lithuania/France), nv. & translator
Ioanna Karystiani (b. 1952, Greece), screenwriter
Lady Kasa (笠郎女, early 8th century, Japan), poet
Marie Luise Kaschnitz (1901–1974, Germany), nv. & poet
Maki Kashimada (鹿島田真希, b. 1976, Japan), fiction wr.
Anna Kashina (living, Russia/United States), nv.
Stoja Kašiković (1865 – post-1927, Serbia), wr.
Nina Kasniunas (b. 1972, United States), wr. & political scientist
Leila Kasra (1939–1989, Iran/Persia), poet & songwriter
Kapka Kassabova (b. 1973, Bulgaria/Scotland), wr. in English
Kassia (810 – pre-865, Byzantium), poet & composer in Greek
Lada Kaštelan (b. 1961, Yugoslavia/Croatia), pw. & screenwriter
Elizabeth Kata (1912–1998, Australia), nv.
Olivera Katarina (b. 1940, Serbia), poet
Hoda Katebi (هدی کاتبی, living, Iran/Persia/United States), fashion wr.
Marianne Katoppo (1943–2007, Indonesia), nv. & theologian
Kazuyo Katsuma (勝間和代, b. 1968, Japan), business wr.
Janina Katz (1939–2013, Poland/Denmark), poet in Danish
Suzan Emine Kaube (b. 1942, Turkey/Ottoman Empire/Germany), non-f. wr.
Gina Kaus (1893–1985, Austria/Austria-Hungary/United States), nv., screenwriter & autobiographer
Julia Kavanagh (1824–1877, Ireland), nv. & non-f. wr.
Rose Kavanagh (1859 or 1860–1891, Ireland), wr. & poet
Joanna Kavenna (b. 1974, England), nv. & travel wr.
Catherine Samali Kavuma (b. 1960, Uganda/United States), nv.
Kazune Kawahara (河原和音, b. 1972, Japan), manga creator
Yumiko Kawahara (川原由美子, b. 1960, Japan), manga creator
Hiromi Kawakami (川上弘美, b. 1958, Japan), nv. & poet
Kikuko Kawakami (川上喜久子, 1904–1985, Japan), fiction wr.
Mieko Kawakami (川上未映子, b. 1976, Japan), fiction & non-f. writer & poet
Mizuki Kawashita (河下水希, b. 1971, Japan), manga creator
Merata Kawharu (living, New Zealand), wr, & academic
Jackie Kay (b. 1961, Scotland), poet & nv.
M. M. Kaye (1908–2004, England), nv. & illustrator
Susanna Kaysen (b. 1948, United States), wr. & mem.
Rimma Kazakova (1932–2008, Soviet Union/Russia), poet
Rabia Kazan (b. 1976, Turkey/Ottoman Empire/United States), political wr.
Elena Kazantseva (b. 1956, Soviet Union/Russia), poet & songwriter
Irena Kazazić (b. 1972, Serbia), wr.
Kazumi Kazui (一井かずみ, living, Japan), manga creator
Ke Yan (柯岩, 1929–2011, China), pw., nv. & poet
Molly Keane (1904–1996, Ireland), nv. & pw.
Susanna Kearsley (b. 1966, Canada/Newfoundland), nv.
Annie Keary (1825–1879, England), nv. & poet
Henrietta Keddie (1827–1914, Scotland), nv. & ch. wr.
Janice Kulyk Keefer (b. 1952, Canada/Newfoundland), nv. & poet
Nancy Keesing (1923–1993, Australia), poet, nv. & non-f. wr.
Antigone Kefala (1935–2022, Australia), poet & prose wr.
Fatou Keïta (b. 1965, Ivory Coast), ch. wr.
China Keitetsi (b. 1976, Uganda), mem.
Anne Kellas (b. 1951, South Africa/Australia), poet
Yuko Takada Keller (高田ケラー有子, b. 1958, Japan), es. & artist
Cathy Kelly (b. 1966, Ireland), nv.
Gwen Kelly (1922–2012, Australia), fiction wr. & poet
Helen Keller (1880–1968, United States), es. & autobiographer
Linda Kelly (1936–2019, England), historian of romanticism
Lindy Kelly (b. 1952, New Zealand), fiction & ch. wr. & pw.
Maeve Kelly (b. 1930, Ireland), fiction wr. & poet
Mary Eva Kelly (1826–1910, Ireland/Australia), poet & es.
Rita Kelly (b. 1953, Ireland), poet & col.
Gene Kemp (1926–2015, England), ch. wr.
Oonya Kempadoo (b. 1966, England), nv.
Margery Kempe (c. 1373–1438, England), autobiographer & mystic
May Kendall (1861–1943, England), poet, nv. & satirist
Latofat Kenjaeva (b. 1950, Tajikistan), poet & wr.
Adrienne Kennedy (b. 1931, United States), pw
Anne Kennedy (b. 1959, New Zealand), nv., poet & screenwriter
Betty Kennedy (1926–2017, Canada/Newfoundland), broadcaster & wr.
Margaret Kennedy (1896–1967, England), nv.
Mary Olivia Kennedy (1880–1943, Ireland/England), critic & col.
Nina Kennedy (b. 1960, United States), memoirist & screenwriter
Pagan Kennedy (b. c. 1963, United States), wr. & col.
Hannah Kent (b. 1985, Australia), wr.
Jacqueline Kent (b. 1947, Australia), biographer & non-f. wr.
Alice Annie Kenny (1875–1960, New Zealand), poet & fiction wr.
Angela Kepler (b. 1943, New Zealand), naturalist & nature wr.
Maylis de Kerangal (b. 1967, France), nv.
Rivka Keren (b. 1946, Hungary/Israel), nv. in Hebrew
Amanda Kerfstedt (1835–1920, Sweden), nv. & pw.
Josephine Kermode (Cushag, 1852–1937, Isle of Man), poet & pw.
Joan Haverty Kerouac (1931–1990, United States), autobiographe
Doris Boake Kerr (Capel Boake, 1899–1945, Australia), nv.
Judith Kerr (1923–1919, Germany/England), ch. wr.
Lady Amabel Kerr (1846–1906, United Kingdom), wr., biog., nv., ch. wr.
Suzi Kerr (b. 1966, New Zealand), economist
Marie-Thérèse Kerschbaumer (b. 1936, Austria/Austria-Hungary), nv. & poet
Fatemeh Keshavarz (b. 1952, Iran/Persia), scholar & poet
Birhan Keskin (b. 1963, Turkey/Ottoman Empire), poet
Eufrosinia Kersnovskaya (1908–1984, Russia/Soviet Union), mem.
Marie Kessels (b. 1954, Netherlands), poet & prose wr.
Jessie Kesson (1916–1994, Scotland), wr.
Hedwig Kettler (1851–1937, Germany), fiction & non-f. wr. & activist
Yvonne Keuls (b. 1931, Dutch East Indies/Netherlands), nv.
Irmgard Keun (1905–1982, Germany), nv.
Ellen Key (1849–1926, Sweden), wr. on family life
Marian Keyes (b. 1963, Ireland), fiction & non-f. wr.
Eugénie De Keyser (1918–2012, Belgium), wr. on art in French
Harriette A. Keyser (1841–1936, United States), nv. & biog.
'Masechele Caroline Ntseliseng Khaketla (1918–2012, Lesotho), poet & educator
Porochista Khakpour (b. 1978, Iran/Persia/United States), nv.
Sheila Khala (b. 1990–1991, Lesotho), poet
Farida Khalaf (b. c. 1995, Iraq), escapee & wr.
Anbara Salam Khalidi (1897–1986, Palestine/Lebanon), political mem.
Sahar Khalifeh (b. 1941, Palestine), nv.
Hamda Khamis (b. 1945, Bahrain), poet & col.
Annie Ali Khan (1980–1918, Pakistan), social & religious wr.
Rabina Khan (b. 1972, Bangladesh/England), wr. & politician
Razia Khan (c. 1936–2011, India/Bangladesh), wr., poet & educator
Rukhsana Khan (b. 1962, Pakistan/Canada/Newfoundland), ch. wr.
Uzma Aslam Khan (living, Pakistan), nv.
Heyran Khanim (1790–1847, Azerbaijan/Iran/Persia), poet in Azerbaijani & Persian
Dalal Khario (b. c. 1997, Iraq), ISIS survivor & mem.
Dima Khatib (b. 1971, Palestine), col. & poet
Rabeya Khatun (1935–2021, India/Bangladesh), nv.
Rita El Khayat (b. 1944, Morocco), psychiatrist & anthropologist
Sabiha Al Khemir (b. 1959, Tunisia), fiction & art wr.
Babilina Khositashvili (1884–1973, Georgia (Caucasus)), poet & feminist
Vénus Khoury-Ghata (b. 1937, Lebanon/France), nv. & poet
Mariam Khutsurauli (b. 1960, Georgia (Caucasus)), poet & fiction wr.
Nadezhda Khvoshchinskaya (1824–1889, Russia), nv.

Ki–Ky
Sue Monk Kidd (b. 1948, United States), nv.
Fiona Kidman (b. 1940, New Zealand), fiction wr., poet & scriptwriter
Celine Kiernan (b. 1967, Ireland), YA wr.
Susan Nalugwa Kiguli (b. 1969, Uganda), poet & scholar
Toshie Kihara (木原敏江, b. 1948, Japan), manga creator
Emelihter Kihleng (living, Manchuria), poet in English
Lali Kiknavelidze (b. 1969, Georgia (Caucasus)), screenwriter & film director
Anne Killigrew (1660–1685, England), poet
Dorothy Kilner (1755–1836, England), ch. wr.
Eeva Kilpi (b. 1928, Finland), fiction wr. & poet
Ae-ran Kim (김애란, b. 1980, Korea), fiction wr.
Kim Byeol-ah (김별아, b. 1969, Korea), nv.
Kim Chae-won (김채원, b. 1946, Korea), fiction wr.
Kim Chi-won (김지원, 1943–2013, Korea/United States), fiction wr.
Kim Hu-ran (김후란, b. 1934, Korea), poet
Kim Hyesoon (김혜순, b. 1955, Korea), poet
Kim Insuk (김인숙, b. 1963, Korea/China), fiction wr.
Kim Myeong-sun (김명순, 1896–1951, Korea), nv. & poet
Myung Mi Kim (김명미, b. 1957, Korea/United States), poet in English
Kim Nam-jo (김남조, b. 1927, Korea), poet & academic
Ronyoung Kim (1926–1987, United States), wr.
Kim Ryeo-ryeong (김려령, b. 1971, Korea), ch. & YA wr.
Kim Sagwa (김사과, b. 1984, Korea), fiction wr. & col.
Kim Seon-wu (김선우, b. 1970, Korea), feminist poet
Kim Seung-hee (김승희, b. 1952, Korea), poet, es. & nv.
Barbara Kimenye (1929–2012, Uganda), ch. wr.
Kodai no Kimi (小大君, fl. 9th or 10th century, Japan), poet
Jamaica Kincaid (b. 1949, Antigua/United States), nv.
Annamária Kinde (b. 1956–2014, Russia), wr. & poet in Hungarian
Aby King (b. 1977, England), wr. & nv.
Carla King (living, Ireland), historian
Grace King (1852–1932, United States), fiction wr. & historian
Margaret King (1773–1835, Ireland/Italy), travel & medical wr.
Rachael King (b. 1970, New Zealand), fiction wr. & musician
Rosamond S. King (living, United States), poet & academic
Tabitha King (b. 1949, United States), nv.
Karen King-Aribisala (living, Guyana/Nigeria), fiction wr. & academic
Mary Kingsley (1862–1900, England), explorer & science wr.
Barbara Kingsolver (b. 1955, United States), fiction wr., poet & es.
Maxine Hong Kingston (b. 1940, Chile/United States), nv. & academic
Johanna Kinkel (1810–1858, Germany), wr., composer & educator
Elaine Kinsella (b. 1981, Ireland), wr. & radio pw.
Yuki Kiriga (霧賀ユキ, living, Japan), manga creator
Eleanor Kirk (1831–1908, United States), wr.
Lucy Kirkwood (b. 1983, UK)
Olga Kirsch (1924–1997, South Africa/Israel), poet in English & Hebrew
Sarah Kirsch (1935–2013, Germany), poet
Rio Kishida (岸田理生, 1946–2003, Japan), pw.
Madhu Kishwar (b. 1951, India), feminist wr.
Noémi Kiss (b. 1974, Hungary), fiction wr. & es.
Nadia Yala Kisukidi (b. 1978, France), wr. & academic
Yao Kitabatake (北畠八穂, 1903–1982, Japan), poet & ch. wr.
Nobori Kiuchi (木内昇, b. 1967), nv.
Iya Kiva (b. 1984, Ukraine), poet, translator, wr.
Ella Kivikoski (1901–1990, Finland), archaeologist
Karin Kiwus (b. 1942, Germany), poet & academic
Carolyn Kizer (1925–2014, United States), poet
Marjun Syderbø Kjelnæs (b. 1974, Faroe Islands), ch. & fiction wr. & poet
Nada Klaić (1920–1988, Yugoslavia/Croatia), historian
Elizabeth Klarer (1910–1994, South Africa), wr. in English on extraterrestrial visions
Gerda Weissmann Klein (1924–2022, Poland/United States), mem. & activist
Naomi Klein (b. 1970, Canada/Newfoundland), wr. & activist
Robin Klein (b. 1936, Australia), ch. wr.
Laureana Wright de Kleinhans (1846–1896, Mexico), poet & activist
Ellen Kleman (1867–1943, Sweden), women's rights activist
Irena Klepfisz (b. 1941, Poland/United States), linguist & activist
Marusya Klimova (b. 1961, Russia/Soviet Union), nv. & es.
Linde Klinckowström-von Rosen (1902–2000, Sweden), equestrian & travel wr.
Ekaterina Kniazhnina (1746–1797, Russia), poet
Anne Knight (1786–1862, England), social reformer
India Knight (b. 1965, England), journalist & author
Anne Knight (1792–1860, England), ch. wr.
Olivia Knight (1830–1908, Ireland/Australia), poet & es.
Sophie von Knorring (1797–1848, Sweden), nv.
Thekla Knös (1815–1880, Sweden), poet & ch. wr.
Lilian Knowles (1870–1926), economic historian
Marion Knowles (1865–1949, Australia), poet & nv.
Elizabeth Knox (b. 1959, New Zealand), fiction wr. & es.
Janette Hill Knox (1845–1920, United States), religious wr., editor, activist, teacher
Kathleen Knox (1847–1930, Ireland), ch. wr. & poet
Mary Norbert Körte (1934–2022, United States), poet, teacher & environmentalist
Miyuki Kobayashi (小林深雪, living, Japan), nv. & manga wr.
Nataliya Kobrynska (1851–1920, Austria/Austria-Hungary/Ukraine), fiction & political wr.
Olha Kobylianska (1863–1942, Austria/Austria-Hungary/Romania), wr. in Ukrainian
Shonagh Koea (b. 1939, New Zealand), fiction wr.
Yun Kōga (高河ゆん, b. 1965, Japan), manga creator
Joy Kogawa (b. 1935, Canada/Newfoundland), nv. & poet
Sheila Kohler (b. 1941, South Africa/United States), fiction wr.
Věra Kohnová (1929–1942, Czechoslovakia/Czech Republic), Hc. diarist
Lydia Koidula (1843–1886, Russia/England), poet in Estonian
Saradha Koirala (b. 1980, New Zealand/Australia), poet & YA wr.
Ingrid de Kok (b. 1951, South Africa), poet in English
Musine Kokalari (1918–1973, Albania), wr. & politician
Jana Kolarič (b. 1954, Yugoslavia/Slovenia), fiction & ch. wr. & pw.
Zlata Kolarić-Kišur (1894–1990, Austria/Austria-Hungary/Yugoslavia), nv. in Croatian
Nellie van Kol (1851-1930, Netherlands), feminist, educator, & ch. wr.
Annette Kolb (1870–1967, Germany), political wr., nv. & wr. on music
Margarete Kollisch (1893–1979, Austria/Austria-Hungary), poet & translator
Alexandra Kollontai (1872–1952, Russia/Soviet Union), wr. & politician
Gertrud Kolmar (1894–1943, Germany), poet & Hc. victim
Anise Koltz (b. 1928, Luxembourg), poet & ch. wr. in French & German
Ono no Komachi (825–900, Japan), poet
Anna Komnene (1083–1183, Byzantium), chronicler & emperor's daughter in Greek; Alexiad
Usher Komugisha (b. c. 1988, Uganda), sports journalist & commentator
Marie Kondo (近藤麻理恵, b. 1984, Japan), organization wr.
Amalia Wilhelmina Königsmarck (1663–1740, Sweden), painter, actor & poet
Fumiyo Kōno (こうの史代, manga creator
Maria Konopnicka (1842–1910, Poland), nv. & poet
Evgenia Konradi (1838–1898, Russia), wr., es. & col.
Ina Konstantinova (1924–1944, Soviet Union), diarist & war victim
Alicia Kopf (b. 1982, Spain), nv. & artist
Ana Kordzaia-Samadashvili (b. 1968, Georgia (Caucasus)), nv. & col.
Alice Graeme Korff (1904–1975, United States), art critic
Rachel Korn (1898–1982, Poland/Canada/Newfoundland), poet & prose wr.
Barbara Korun (b. 1963, Yugoslavia/Slovenia), poet
Sonya Koshkina (b. 1985, Ukraine), journalist, & editor-in-chief
Birgithe Kosovic (b. 1972, Denmark), nv.
Zofia Kossak-Szczucka (1889–1968, Poland), political wr. & Hc. survivor
Lina Kostenko (b. 1930, Soviet Union/Ukraine), poet
Elizabeth Kostova (b. 1964, United States), nv.
Rita Kothari (b. 1969, India), social & political wr.
Helene Kottanner (c. 1400 – post-1470, Hungary), mem. in German
Adjoua Flore Kouamé (b. 1964, Ivory Coast), nv.
Sofia Kovalevskaya (1859–1891, Russia), wr. & mathematician
Heda Margolius Kovály (1919–2010, Czechoslovakia/Czech Republic/United States), wr. & Hc. survivor
Shih-Li Kow (b. 1968, Malaysia), fiction wr.
Chana Kowalska (1899 – c. 1942, Poland/France), art wr. & Hc. victim
Faustina Kowalska (1905–1938, Poland), diarist, nun & religious wr.
Natsuki Koyata (古谷田 =奈月, b. 1981, Japan), nv.
Alicia Kozameh (b. 1953, Argentina), fiction wr. & poet
Nadezhda Kozhevnikova (b. 1949, Soviet Union/Russia), nv.
Zoya Krakhmalnikova (1929–2008, Soviet Union/Russia), scholar & autobiographer
Hanna Krall (b. 1935, Poland), wr., nv. & Hc. survivor
Taja Kramberger (b. 1970, Yugoslavia/Slovenia), poet, es. & anthropologist
Clementine Krämer (1873–1942, Germany), poet, fiction wr. & Hc. victim
Judith Krantz (1928–2019, United States), wr. & col.
Eliška Krásnohorská (1847–1946, Austria/Austria-Hungary/Czechoslovakia/Czech Republic), feminist wr.
Nicole Krauss (b. 1974, United States), fiction wr. & es.
Helen Kleinbort Krauze (living, Poland/Mexico), travel wr. & col.
Ursula Krechel (b. 1947, Germany), poet, prose wr. & pw.
Katarzyna Krenz (b. 1953, Poland/Peru), nv., poet & painter
Maruša Krese (1947–2013, Yugoslavia/Slovenia), poet & fiction wr.
Michelle de Kretser (b. 1957, Australia), nv.
Velga Krile (1945–1991, Latvia), poet & pw.
Uma Krishnaswami (b. 1956, India/United States), ch. wr.
Julia Kristeva (b. 1941, Bl/France), nv. & philosopher
Gerður Kristný (b. 1970, Iceland), poet & nv.
Ágota Kristóf (1935–2011, Hungary/Switzerland), nv. in French
Vesna Krmpotić (1932–2018, Yugoslavia/Croatia), nv.
Antjie Krog (b. 1952, South Africa), poet & academic in Afrikaans
Leena Krohn (b. 1947, Finland), fiction & ch. wr. & es.
Brigitte Kronauer (1940–2019, Germany), nv.
Yvonne Kroonenberg (b. 1950, Netherlands), non-f. wr.
Helen Aldrich De Kroyft (1818–1915, United States), wr.
Olga Kryuchkova (b. 1966, Soviet Union/Russia), nv.
Marta Krūmiņa-Vitrupe (1908–2010, Latvia/United States), poet & es.
Mina Kruseman (1839–1922, Netherlands), pw. & mem.
Agnes von Krusenstjerna (1894–1940, Sweden), nv.
Christina Krüsi (b. 1968, Bolivia/Switzerland), wr. on child abuse in German
Susanna Kubelka (b. 1942, Austria/Austria-Hungary), nv. & col.
Žofia Kubini (fl. 17th century, Hungary), poet in Czech
Rohana Kudus (1884–1972, Dutch East Indies/Indonesia), wr. on women's skills
Ayşe Kulin (b. 1941, Turkey/Ottoman Empire), fiction & screenwriter
Annette Kullenberg (1939–2021, Sweden), nv. & broadcasting pw.
Mojca Kumerdej (b. 1964, Yugoslavia/Slovenia), fiction wr. & critic
Maxine Kumin (1925–2014, United States), poet & ch. wr.
Xu Kun (徐坤, b. 1965, China), fiction wr.
Maria Kuncewiczowa (1895–1989, Poland/United States), nv.
Kirsi Kunnas (1924–2021, Finland), poet & ch. wr.
Thérèse Kuoh-Moukouri (b. 1938, Cameroon/France), nv. & es.
İsmet Kür (1916–2013, Turkey/Ottoman Empire), ch. wr.
Maki Kureishi (1927–1995, India/Pakistan), wr.
Natsuko Kuroda (黒田 夏子, b. 1937, Japan), fiction wr.
Tetsuko Kuroyanagi (黒柳徹子, b. 1933, Japan), ch. wr. & actor
Irma Kurti (b. 1966, Albania), poet & wr.
Gerdina Hendrika Kurtz (1899–1989, Netherlands), history wr.
Isolde Kurz (1853–1944, Germany), poet & fiction wr.
Meta Kušar (b. 1952, Yugoslavia/Slovenia), poet & es.
Rachel Kushner (b. 1968, United States), nv.
Ellen Kuzwayo (1914–2006, South Africa), activist & politician in English
Zofka Kveder (1878–1926, Austria/Austria-Hungary/Yugoslavia), fiction wr. & pw. in Slovenian
Nestan Kvinikadze (b. 1980, Georgia (Caucasus)), scriptwriter & pw.
Jean Kwok (living, United States), nv.
Kwon Teckyoung (권택영, b. 1947, Korea), critic & academic
Kwon Yeo-sun (권여선, b. 1965, Korea), fiction wr.
Joanne Kyger (1934–2017, United States), poet
Goretti Kyomuhendo (b. 1965, Uganda), nv. & activist

L

La–Le
Esmeralda Labye (b. 1973, Belgium), journalist
Ángela Labordeta (b. 1964, Spain), fiction wr.
Carilda Oliver Labra (1922–2018, Cuba), poet
Maria del Pilar Maspons i Labrós (1841–1907, Spain), poet & novelist
María Elvira Lacaci (1916–1997, Spain), poet
María Hortensia Lacau (1910–2006, Argentina), pedagogue, wr., es., poet, educator
Bernarda de Lacerda (1596–1644, Portugal), scholar & pw.
Vera Lachmann (1904–1985, Germany/United States), poet & educator
Djanet Lachmet (b. 1948, Algeria/France), nv. & actor
Minna Lachs (1907–1993, Austria/Austria-Hungary), educator & mem.
Camilla Läckberg (b. 1974, Sweden), nv.
Mercedes Lackey (b. 1950, United States), nv.
Anna Lacková-Zora (1899–1988, Austria/Austria-Hungary/Czechoslovakia/Czech Republic), poet & fiction wr. in Slovak
Monique Laederach (1938–2004, Switzerland), poet, nv. & radio pw. in French
Ann-Helén Laestadius (b. 1971, Sweden), YA wr.
May Laffan (1849–1916, Ireland), nv.
Carmen Laforet (1921–2004, Spain), fiction wr.
Marcela Lagarde (b. 1948, Mexico), social wr. & politician
Selma Lagerlöf (1858–1940, Sweden), nv. & ch. wr.; 1909 Nobel Prize in Literature
Magdalene Isadora La Grange (1864–1935, United States), poet
Margaret Rebecca Lahee (1831–1895, Ireland/England), dialect wr.
Shahla Lahiji (b. 1942, Iran/Persia), wr.
Jhumpa Lahiri (b. 1967, England/United States), fiction wr.
Ana Emilia Lahitte (1921–2013, Argentina), poet, pw. & es.
Leila Lahlou (living, Morocco), autobiographer
Maria Chessa Lai (1922–2012, Italy), poet
Maria Laina (b. 1947, Greece), poet
Sinikka Laine (b. 1945, Finland), YA wr.
Sylvie Lainé (b. 1957, France), science fiction wr.
Olivia Laing (b. 1977, England), wr. & cultural critic
Sarah Laing (b. 1973, New Zealand), fiction wr., mem. & cartoonist
Angeliki Laiou (1941–2008, Greece/United States), historian of Byzantium
Elizabeth Laird (b. 1943, England), travel & ch. wr.
Natasha Lako (b. 1948, Albania), poet & nv.
Laila Lalami (b. 1968, Morocco/United States), es. & nv.
Nuray Lale (b. 1962, Turkey/Ottoman Empire/Germany), wr.
Ritu Lalit (b. 1964, India), fiction wr.
Lalleshwari (Lal Arifa; 1320–1392, India), mystic & poet in Kashmiri
Caitriona Lally (living, Ireland), fiction wr.
Nikita Lalwani (living, India/Wales), nv.
Marta Lamas (b. 1947, Mexico), anthropologist & political scientist
Lady Caroline Lamb (1785–1828, England), nv.
Charlotte Lamb (Sheila Holland, 1937–2000, Isle of Man), nv.
Christina Lamb (b. 1965, England), wr. & columnist
Helen Lamb (1956–2017, Scotland), poet
Mary Lamb (1764–1847, England), co-wr. of Charles Lamb
Alice Elinor Lambert (1886–1981, United States), nv.
Mitì Vigliero Lami (b. 1957, Italy), es. & poet
Regina de Lamo (1870–1947, Spain), political wr.
Elish Lamont (c. 1800/1816–1870, Ireland), wr. & miniaturist
Anne Lamott (b. 1954, United States), fiction & non-f. wr.
Astrid Lampe (b. 1955, Netherlands), poet & actor
Rachida Lamrabet (b. 1970, Morocco/Belgium), nv. & pw. in Flemish
Wafaa Lamrani (b. 1960, Morocco), poet
Beatrice Lamwaka (living, Uganda), fiction & non-f. wr.
Luo Lan (1919–2015, Taiwan), wr. & radio personality.
Leena Lander (b. 1955, Finland), nv.
Fran Landesman (1927–2011, United States), poet & lyricist
Margarita Landi (1918–2004, Spain), nv. & screenwriter
Zoila Ugarte de Landívar (1864–1969, Ecuador), wr. & suffragist
Salcia Landmann (1911–2002, Ukraine/Switzerland), writer in Yiddish
Letitia Elizabeth Landon (L. E. L., 1802–1838, England), poet & nv.
Margaret Landon (1903–1993, United States), nv.
Liliane Landor (b. c. 1956, Lebanon), non-f. wr.
Michele Landsberg (b. 1939, Can), wr., feminist & activist
Ruth Landshoff (1904–1966, Germany/United States), poet & wr. in German & English
Anne Landsman (b. 1959, South Africa), nv. in English
Jane Lane (1905–1978, England), nv. & biographer
Margaret Lane (1907–1994, England), journalist, biographer & nv.
Fátima Langa (1953– 2017, Mozambique), wr., poet, & publisher
Annabel Langbein (b. 1958, New Zealand), food wr. & cook
Rosamond Langbridge (1880–1964, Ireland), poet, nv. & pw.
Dagmar Lange (1914–1991, Sweden), nv.
Norah Lange (1905–1972, Argentina), poet, nv. & autobiographer
Katja Lange-Müller (b. 1951, Germany), nv.
Gertrude Langer (1908–1984, Australia), art critic
Anna Langfus (1920–1966, Poland/France), pw., nv. & Hc. survivor
Elisabeth Langgässer (1899–1950, Germany), poet, nv. & Hc. survivor
Eve Langley (1908–1974, Australia/New Zealand), nv.
Mary Lewis Langworthy (1872–1949, United States), pw.
Emilia Lanier (1569–1645, England), poet
Coral Lansbury (1929–1991, Australia), nv. & academic
Sara Berenguer Laosa (1919–2010, Spain), feminist wr.
Jeanne Lapauze (1860–1920, France), poet & nv.
Paula Lapido (b. 1975, Spain), fiction wr.
Nadezhda Lappo-Danilevsky (1874–1951, Russia/France), poet & fiction wr.
Alda Lara (1930–1962, Algeria), poet
Justine Larbalestier (b. 1967), YA fiction wr.
Lucy Larcom (1824–1893, United States), poet & mill girl
Rebecca Hammond Lard (1772–1855, United States), poet
Dalenda Larguèche (b. 1953, Tunisia), historian
Yasmeen Lari (b. c. 1941, India/Pakistan), wr. on architecture
Anna Larina (1914–1996, Russia/Soviet Union), mem.
Glenda Larke (living, Australia), fiction & non-f. wr.
Viveca Lärn (b. 1944, Sweden), ch. wr.
Claudia Lars (1899–1974, Somalia), poet
Hanna Astrup Larsen (1873–1945), writer, editor, translator
Marianne Nøhr Larsen (b. 1963, Denmark), anthropologist & social wr.
Nella Larsen (1891–1964, United States), fiction wr.
Trude Brænne Larssen (b. 1967, Norway), nv.
Åsa Larsson (b. 1966, Sweden), nv.
Guðrún Lárusdóttir (1880–1938, Iceland), wr. & politician
Else Lasker-Schüler (1869–1945, Germany), poet & pw.
Marghanita Laski (1915–1988, England), fiction wr., biographer & pw.
Ana Irma Rivera Lassén (b. 1955, Paraguay), poet, feminist & lawyer
Margrethe Lasson (1659–1738, Denmark), poet & nv. in Danish
Oriane Lassus (born 1987, France), wr., cartoonist, illustrator
Marija Lastauskienė (1872–1957, Lithuania), fiction wr.
Agnes Latham (1905–1996, England), wr., editor & academic
Irene Latham (b. 1971, United States), poet & ch. wr.
Mary Artemisia Lathbury (1841–1913, United States), hymnist & poet
Lathóg of Tír Chonaill (fl. 9th century, Ireland), poet
Yulia Latynina (b. 1966, Russia), wr.
Evelyn Lau (b. 1971, Canada/Newfoundland), poet & nv.
Margaret Laurence (1926–1987, Canada/Newfoundland), fiction wr.
Camille Laurens (b. 1957, France), nv.
Vivi Laurent-Täckholm (1898–1978), Sweden), botanist & ch. wr.
Dorianne Laux (b. 1952, United States), poet
Christine Lavant (1915–1973, Austria/Austria-Hungary), religious poet & nv.
Maura Laverty (1907–1966, Ireland), fiction & cookery wr. & broadcaster
Mary Lavin (1912–1996, Ireland), fiction wr.
Mónica Lavín (b. 1955, Mexico), fiction & YA wr.
Nel Law (1914–1990, Australia), poet, diarist & artist
Emily Lawless (1845–1913, Ireland), nv. & poet
Patrice Lawrence (living, England), fiction wr.
Alice Lawrenson (1841–1900, Ireland), botanist & gardener
Louisa Lawson (1848–1920, Australia), poet, wr. & feminist
Mary Lawson (b. 1946, Canada/Newfoundland), nv.
Sylvia Lawson (1932–2017, Australia), historian & critic
Auður Laxness (1918–2012, Iceland), wr.
Jelena Lazarević (1365–1443, Serbia), wr.
Simone Lazaroo (b. 1961, Australia), nv.
Ruzha Lazarova (b. 1968, Bulgaria/France), fiction wr. & pw.
Emma Lazarus (1849–1887, United States), poet; "The New Colossus" (inscribed on Statue of Liberty)
Henryka Łazowertówna (1909–1942, Poland), poet & Hc. victim
Linda Lê (1963–2022, Vietnam/France), nv.
Sonya Lea (b. 1960, United States), ess., memoirist, & screenwr.
Mary Leadbeater (1758–1826, Ireland), poet & prose wr.
Jane Leade (1624–1704, England), mystic
Anna Leader (b. 1996, Luxembourg), poet & nv. in English
Caroline Woolmer Leakey (1827–1881, Australia), poet & nv.
Louisa Leaman (b. 1976, England), wr. on education
Sarah Lean (living, England), ch. wr.
Danuza Leão (1933–2022, Brazil), wr. & col.
Mary Leapor (1722–1746, England), poet
Ada Leask (1899–1987, Ireland), historian & antiquary
Diana Lebacs (1947–2022, Curaçao), ch. wr.
Marie Leblanc (1867–1915, Mauritius), editor, nv. & translator
Joanna Lech (b. 1984, Poland), poet & nv.
Katherine Leckie (1860 –1930, Canada/United States), journalist, editor & suffragist
Amalia González Caballero de Castillo Ledón (1898–1986, Mexico), es. & pw.
Violette Leduc (1907–1972, France), nv. & autobiographer
Andrea Lee (living, United States), nv. & mem.
Harper Lee (1926–2016, United States), nv.; To Kill a Mockingbird
Harriet Lee (1757–1851, England), nv. & pw.
Lee Hye-gyeong (이혜경, b. 1960, Korea), fiction wr.
Ida Lee (1865–1943, Australia), historian & poet
Lee Hye-gyeong (이혜경, b. 1960, Korea), poet
Muna Lee (1895–1965, United States), poet & translator
Sophia Lee (1750–1824, England), pw. & nv.
Tanith Lee (1947–2015, England), nv., poet & screenwriter
Sarah Leech (1809–1830, Ireland), poet
Sue Lees (1941–2002, England), academic, activist, feminist & wr.
Valentine Leeper (1900–2001, Australia), classicist & correspondent
Alicia Le Fanu (1791–1826, Ireland), poet & fiction wr.
Alicia Sheridan Le Fanu (1753–1817, Ireland), wr.
Anne Charlotte Leffler (1849–1892, Sweden), fiction wr. & pw.
Joy Leftow (living, United States), poet
Květa Legátová (1919–2012, Czechoslovakia/Czech Republic), fiction wr. & es.
Michele Leggott (b. 1956, New Zealand), poet & academic
Susana Molinari Leguizamón, (ff. from 1939, Argentina), poet
Ágnes Lehóczky (b. 1976, Hungary), poet & academic
Tuija Lehtinen (b. 1954, Finland), ch. wr. & nv.
Leena Lehtolainen (b. 1964, Finland), crime wr.
Nechama Leibowitz (1905–1997, Latvia/Israel), Bible scholar
Käthe Leichter (1895–1942, Austria/Austria-Hungary), politician & economist
Julia Leigh (b. 1970, Australia), nv. & screenwriter
Laura Leiner (b. 1985, Hungary), YA wr.
Adeline Leitzbach (1884–1968, United States), pw. & screenwr.
Vesna Lemaić (b. 1981, Yugoslavia/Slovenia), fiction wr.
Katerina Lemmel (1466–1533, Germany), correspondent & nun
Aïcha Lemsine (b. 1942, Algeria), nv. & activist
Madeleine L'Engle (1918–2007, United States), nv. & ch. nv.
Sue Lenier (b. 1957, England), poet & pw.
Lalitha Lenin (b. 1946, India), poet
Rebecca Lenkiewicz (b. 1968, England), pw.
Ellen Lenneck (Helene Weichardt, 1851–1880, Germany), nv. & story wr.
Anna Maria Lenngren (1754–1817, Sweden), wr. & poet
Biddy White Lennon (1946–2017, Ireland), food wr.
Charlotte Lennox (c. 1730–1804 United States/England), wr., poet, & pw.
Elizabeth Emmet Lenox-Conyngham (1800 – c. 1889, Ireland), poet
Melosina Lenox-Conyngham (1941–2011, Ireland), wr.
Hélène Lenoir (b. 1955, France), wr.
Conchi León (b. 1973, Mexico), wr.
Magdalena León de Leal (b. 1939, Colombia), non-f. wr.
María Teresa León (1903–1988, Spain), fiction & ch. wr.
Mae Leonard (b. c. 1940), poet, wr. & broadcaster
Vange Leonel (1963–2014, Brazil), nv. & musician
Anne Leinonen (b. 1973, Finland), science fiction & fantasy wr.
Marie Lenéru (1875–1918, France), plw. & diarist
Donna Leon (b. 1942, United States), nv.
Marie Léopold-Lacour (1859–1942, France), feminist, journalist, wr.
Jónína Leósdóttir (b. 1954, Iceland), nv. & pw.
Marie Léra (1864–1958, France), journalist, nv. & translator
Samantha Leriche-Gionet (born 1985, Canada), animator, illustrator, & comic strip wr.
Gerda Lerner (1920–2013, Austria/Austria-Hungary/England), pw. & non-f. wr. in English
Yva Léro (1912–2007, Martinique), wr. & artist
Katharyne Lescailje (1649–1711, Netherlands), poet
Doris Leslie (1891–1982, England), nv. & biographer
Mary Isabel Leslie (1899–1978, Ireland), nv.
May Sybil Leslie (1887–1937, England), chemist & wr.
Ľuba Lesná (b. 1954, Czechoslovakia/Czech Republic/Slovakia), col., nv. & pw.
Elsie Lessa (1912–2000, Brazil), wr.
Doris Lessing (1919–2013, England), fiction wr., poet & biographer; 2007 Nobel Prize in Literature
Dewi Lestari (b. 1976, Indonesia), wr. & songwriter
Lilian Leveridge (1879–1953, England/Canada), poet, ss. wr., non-f. wr.
Rosa Leveroni (1910–1985, Spain), poet & es. in Catalan
Ada Leverson (1862–1933, England). nv.
Denise Levertov (1923–1997, England), US poet & es.
Robin Levett (1925–2008, Australia), travel wr. & nv.
Celia Moss Levetus (1819–1873, England), poet & historian
Sonya Levien (1888–1960, Russia/United States), screenwriter
Tanya Levin (b. 1971, Australia), non-f. wr.
Gail Carson Levine (b. 1947, United States), YA nv.
June Levine (1931–2008, Ireland/Canada/Newfoundland), nv. & feminist
Sonia Levitin (b. 1934, Germany/United States), nv., ch. wr. & Hc. survivor
Amy Levy (1861–1889, England), poet, es. & nv.
Andrea Levy (1956–2019, England), nv.
Deborah Levy (b. 1959, South Africa/England), pw., fiction wr. & poet
Fanny Lewald (1811–1889, Germany), nv. & feminist
Olive Lewin (1927–2013, Jamaica), social anthropologist & musicologist
Alethea Lewis (1749–1827, England), nv.
Corinth Morter Lewis (living, Belize), educator & poet
Eiluned Lewis (1900–1979, Wales), nv. & poet
Gwyneth Lewis (b. 1959, Wales), poet
Hilda Lewis (1896–1974, England), historical & ch. wr.
Janet Lewis (1899–1998, United States), nv.
Wendy Lewis (b. 1962, Australia), non-f. wr. & pw.
Sibylle Lewitscharoff (b. 1954, Germany), nv. & radio pw.
Marina Lewycka (b. 1946, England), nv.
Anne Ley (c. 1599–1641, England), wr. & polemicist
Pauline de Lézardière (1754–1835, France), historian
Toti Martínez de Lezea (b. 1949, Spain), nv. & ch. wr.

Li–Ly
Li Qingzhao (李清照, fl. early 12th century, China), poet & es.
Li Ye (李冶, died 784, China)
Marita Liabø (b. 1971, Norway), wr.
Liadain (fl. 7th century, Ireland), poet & nun
Liang Desheng (梁德繩, 1771–1847, China), poet & wr.
Mechtilde Lichnowsky (1879–1958, Germany), poet, pw. & es.
Isabella Lickbarrow (1784–1847, England), poet
J.S. Anna Liddiard (1773–1819, Ireland), poet
Sara Lidman (1923–2004, Sweden), nv. & political wr.
Lauren Liebenberg (b. 1972, Zimbabwe/South Africa), nv. in English
Erika Liebman (1738–1803, Sweden), poet & academic
Gemma Lienas (b. 1951, Spain), fiction & ch. wr.
Deborah Lifchitz (1907–1942, France), linguist
Muthoni Gachanja Likimani (b. 1926, Kenya), political wr.
Werewere Liking (b. 1950, Cameroon/Ivory Coast), wr. & pw.
Rosa Liksom (b. 1958, Finland), fiction & ch. wr.
Suzanne Lilar (1901–1992, Belgium), pw., es. & nv. in French
Irmelin Sandman Lilius (b. 1936 Finland), fiction & ch. wr. in Swedish
Kate Lilley (b. 1960, Australia), poet & academic
Birgitta Lillpers (b. 1958, Sweden), poet & nv.
Hayeon Lim (임하연, b. 1993, Korea), non-f. wr. & socialite
Margaret Lim (1947–2011, Malaysia/Canada/Newfoundland), ch. wr.
Rossy Evelin Lima (b. 1986, Mexico/United States), poet & academic
Lin Huiyin (林徽因, 1904–1955, China), architect & wr.
Lin Zongsu (林宗素, 1878–1942, China), wr. & suffragist
Olga F. Linares (1936–2014, Panama/United States), anthropologist & archaeologist
Martha D. Lincoln (1838–?, United States), wr. & journalist
Freda Linde (1915–2013, South Africa), ch. wr. in Afrikaans
Gunnel Linde (1924–2014, Sweden), ch. wr.
Johanna Dorothea Lindenaer (1664–1737, Netherlands), wr. & mem.
Gurli Linder (1865–1947, Sweden), ch. book critic
Madeline Linford (1895–1975), journalist & nv.
Astrid Lindgren (1907–2002, Sweden), ch. nv.; Pippi Longstocking
Barbro Lindgren (b. 1937, Sweden), ch. & YA wr.
Minna Lindgren (b. 1963, Finland), col. & nv.
Elvira Lindo (b. 1962, Spain), nv. & pw.
Marita Lindquist (1918–2016, Finland), ch. wr. in Swedish
Hilarie Lindsay (1922–2021, Australia), ch. & non-f. wr. & poet
Joan A'Beckett Lindsay (1896–1984, Australia), nv.
Rose Lindsay (1885–1978), biographer & print maker
Eva Lindström (b. 1939, Sweden), ch. wr. & illustrator
Merethe Lindstrøm (b. 1963, Norway), fiction wr.
Ling Shuhua (凌叔华, 1904–1990, China), wr. & painter
Věra Linhartová (b. 1938, Czechoslovakia/Czech Republic), wr. & art historian
Elizabeth Linington (1921–1988, United States), nv.
Kelly Link (b. 1968, United States), fiction wr. & editor
Baik Sou Linne (백수린, b. 1982, Korea), fiction wr.
Olga Lipovskaya (1954–2021, Soviet Union), poet
Rosina Lippi (b. 1956, United States), wr.
Laura Lippman (b. 1958, United States), crime fiction wr.
Ewa Lipska (b. 1945, Poland), poet
Katri Lipson (b. 1965, Finland), nv.
Cvetka Lipuš (b. 1966, Austria/Austria-Hungary/United States), poet in Slovenian
Henriqueta Lisboa (1901–1985, Brazil), poet
Irene Lisboa (1892–1958, Portugal), fiction wr., poet & es.
Helena Lisická (1930–2009, Czechoslovakia/Czech Republic), ethnographer
Clarice Lispector (1920–1977, Ukraine/Brazil), fiction wr.
Elisa Lispector (1911–1989, Brazil), nv.
S. E. Lister (b. 1988, England), nv.
Carol Liston (living, Australia), historian
Ellen Liston (1838–1885, Australia), fiction wr. & poet
Jessie Sinclair Litchfield (1883–1956, Australia), poet & non-f. wr.
Lucía Lijtmaer (b. 1977, Argentina/Spain), fiction & non-f. wr.
Angela Litschev (b. 1978, Bulgaria/Germany), poet & critic
Linda Little (b. 1959, Canada, fiction wr.
Heather Little-White (1952–2013, Jamaica), nutritionist & disabilities activist
Liu Rushi (柳如是, 1618–1664, China), poet & courtesan
Penelope Lively (b. 1933, England), nv. & ch. wr.
Dorothy Livesay (1909–1996, Canada/Newfoundland), poet
Aurora Ljungstedt (1821–1908, Sweden), nv.
Eulàlia Lledó (b. 1952, Spain), philologist & critic
Luljeta Lleshanaku (b. 1968, Albania), poet & editor
Kate Llewellyn (b. 1936, Australia), poet, diarist & travel wr.
Pilar Molina Llorente (b. 1943, Spain), ch. wr.
Martha Llwyd (1766–1845, Wales), poet & hymnist
Teresa Lo (living, United States), wr.
Guadalupe Loaeza (b. 1946, Mexico), social wr.
Aké Loba (1927–2012, Ivory Coast/France), wr. & politician
Mira Lobe (1913–1995, Austria/Austria-Hungary), ch. wr.
Joice NanKivell Loch, (1887–1982, Australia), prose wr.
Liz Lochhead (b. 1947, Scotland), poet & pw.
Attica Locke (b. 1974, United States), nv.
Elsie Locke (1912–2001, New Zealand), political wr. & historian
Lilian Locke (1869–1950, Australia), fiction wr.
Sumner Locke (1881–1917, Australia), fiction wr., poet & pw.
Patricia Lockwood (b. 1982, United States), poet, nv. & ess.
Anna Rutgers van der Loeff (1910–1990, Netherlands), ch. wr.
Amanda Lohrey (b. 1947, Australia), nv. & es.
Mirra Lokhvitskaya (1869–1905, Russia), poet
Lesley Lokko (living, Ghana/Gold Coast/Scotland), nv. & academic
Joan London (1901–1971, United States), fiction wr. & biographer
Joan London (b. 1948, Australia), fiction wr. & screenwriter
Joan Long (1925–1999, Australia), screenwriter & producer
Ruth Frances Long (b. 1971, Ireland), fiction & YA wr.
Tessa de Loo (b. 1946, Netherlands), fiction wr.
Julienne van Loon (b. 1970, Australia), nv. & non-f. wr.
Anita Loos (1888–1981, United States), screenwriter, pw. & nv.
Abie Longstaff (living, Australia/England), ch. wr.
Josefina Lopez (b. 1969, United States), pw., screenwriter & nv.
Laia Martínez i López (b. 1984, Spain), poet & musician
Pura López Colomé (b. 1952, Mexico), poet & translator
Rosa María Cid López (b. 1956, Spain), geographer & historian
Rosaura Lopez (1932–2005, Spain/United States), mem.
Karen Lord (b. 1968, Barbados), fiction wr.
Gabrielle Lord (b. 1946, Australia), crime wr.
Audre Lorde (1934–1992, United States), poet
Emilie Loring (1864–1951, United States), singer
Marguerite St. Leon Loud (1812–1889, United States), poet & wr.
Laura Glen Louis (living, United States), wr., poet & es.
Regina Louise (b. 1963, United States), wr. & child advocate
Jarmila Loukotková (1923–2007, Czechoslovakia/Czech Republic), nv.
Anna M. Louw (1913–2003, South Africa), nv. in Afrikaans
Jennifer LoveGrove (living, Canada), nv.
Rosalie Loveling (1834–1875, Belgium), poet, nv. & es. in Flemish
Virginie Loveling (1836–1923, Belgium), poet, nv. & ch. wr. in Flemish
Monica Lovinescu (1923–2008), fiction wr. & critic
Trisha Low (living, United States), poet
Helen Lowe (b. 1961, New Zealand), nv.
Amy Lowell (1874–1925, United States), poet
Brigid Lowry (b. 1953, New Zealand), ch. & YA wr. & poet
Lois Lowry (b. 1937, United States), ch. wr.
Mina Loy (1882–1966, England), poet & artist
Dulce María Loynaz (1902–1997, Cuba), poet & nv.
Irene Lozano (b. 1971, Spain), es. & politician
Orietta Lozano (b. 1956, Comoros), poet
Lü Bicheng (呂碧城, 1883–1943, China), wr., poet & activist
Tekla Teresa Łubieńska (1767–1810, Poland), pw. & poet
Loreen Rice Lucas (1914–2011, Canada), humorous wr. & columnist 
Melissa Lucashenko (b. 1967, Australia), fiction & non-f. wr.
Clare Boothe Luce (1903–1987, United States), editor, pw. & col.
Cornelia Lüdecke (b. 1954, Germany), wr. & polar researcher
Rosario Lufrano (b. 1962, Argentina), journalist, broadcaster & reporter
Lya Luft (1938–2021, Brazil), wr. & translator
Eleonora Luthander (1954–2021, Sweden/Servia), poet, col. & translator
Kristina Lugn (1948–2020, Sweden), poet & pw.
Maria Lugones (1944–2020), Argentina), feminist philosopher, wr. & academic
Nina Lugovskaya (1918–1993, Soviet Union/Russia), diarist & artist
Viivi Luik (b. 1946, Estonia), poet & prose wr.
Valeria Luiselli (b. 1983, Mexico/United States), fiction wr.
Clotilde Luisi (1882–1969, Uruguay), lawyer & activist
Luisa Luisi (1883–1940, Uruguay), poet & critic
Tamara Lujak (b. 1976, Serbia), science fiction & fantasy wr.
Mária Bajzek Lukács (b. 1960, Hungary/Slovenia), wr. on language in Slovenian
Meilė Lukšienė (1913–2009, Austria/Austria-Hungary/Lithuania), cultural historian & educator
Kiba Lumberg (b. 1956, Finland), screenwriter & artist
Catharine Lumby (living, Australia), academic & col.
Jane Lumley, Baroness Lumley (1537–1578, England), translator
Violeta Luna (b. 1943, Ecuador), poet, es. & critic
Ulla-Lena Lundberg (b. 1947, Finland), travel wr., nv. & poet in Swedish
Guðrún frá Lundi (1887–1935, Iceland), fiction wr.
Luo Luo (落落, living, China), nv. & film director
Alison Lurie (1926–2020, United States), nv. & academic
Pilar de Lusarreta (1914–1967, Argentina), fiction & non-f. wr.
Masiela Lusha (b. 1985, Albania/United States), wr. & actor
Jadwiga Łuszczewska (1834–1908, Poland), poet & nv.
Elizabeth Lutyens (1874–1964, England), religious wr.
Emilie Luzac (1748–1788, Netherlands/Flanders), correspondent
Olga Luzardo (1916–2016, Venezuela), journalist, poet & activist
Hannah Lynch (1859–1904, Ireland), nv. & satirist
Marta Lynch (1925–1985, Argentina), fiction wr.
Patricia Lynch (c. 1894–1972, Ireland), ch. wr. & col.
Philomena Lynott (1930–2019, Ireland/England), wr. & mem.
Annabel Lyon (b. 1971, Canada/Newfoundland), fiction wr.
Elinor Lyon (1921–2008, Wales/England), ch. wr.
Enid Lyons (1897–1981, Australia), biographer & politician
Genevieve Lyons (1930–2018, Ireland/England), nv.
Edith Joan Lyttleton (1873–1945, Australia/New Zealand), nv.

See also

Feminist literary criticism
Feminist science fiction
Feminist theory
Gender in science fiction
List of biographical dictionaries of female writers
List of early-modern British women novelists
List of early-modern British women playwrights
List of early-modern British women poets
List of female detective/mystery writers
List of female poets
List of women cookbook writers
List of feminist literature
List of female rhetoricians
List of women hymn writers
Norton Anthology of Literature by Women
Women in science fiction
Women Writers Project
Women's writing in English
Sophie (digital lib)

References

External links
A Celebration of Women Writers
SAWNET: The South Asian Women's NETwork Bookshelf
Victorian Women Writers Project
Voices from the Gaps: Women Artists & Writers of Color
The Women wr.s Archive: Early Modern Women Writers Online
SOPHIE: a digital library of works by German-speaking women
REBRA: a list of women writers from Brazil. Biographies in Portuguese, English, & in Spanish

Women and the arts